= German Wikipedia =

German-language edition of Wikipedia

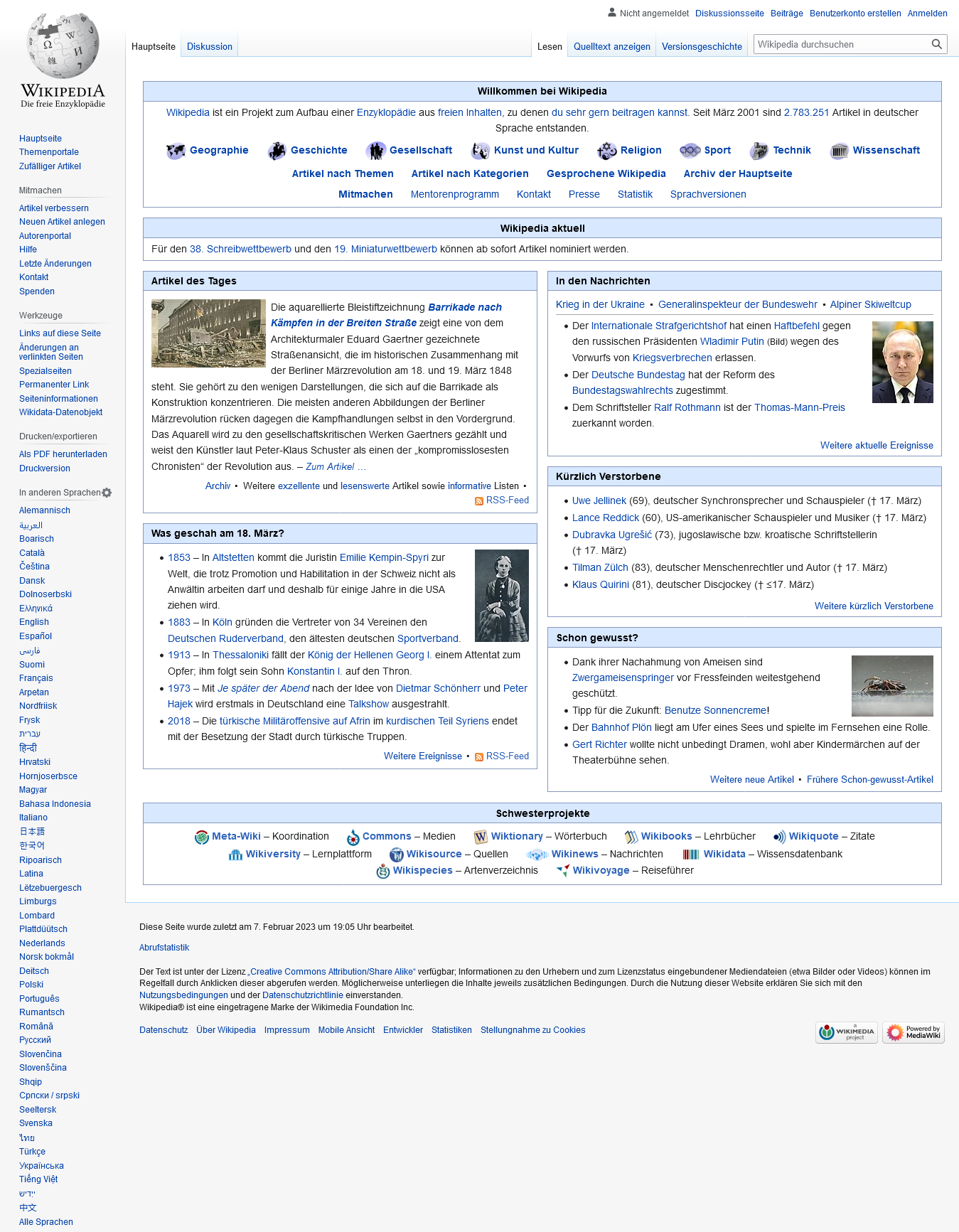
- Screenshot Main Page of the German Wikipedia in March 2023
- Website type: Internet encyclopedia project
- Available in: German
- Owner: Wikimedia Foundation
- Editor: German-language Wikipedia community
- Website: de.wikipedia.org
- Commercial: No
- Registration: Optional
- Users: 5.46 million (as of 16 November 2026)
- Launched: 16 March 2001; 25 years ago
- Content license: Creative Commons Attribution/ Share-Alike 4.0 (most text also dual-licensed under GFDL). Media licensing varies.

The German Wikipedia (German: Deutschsprachige Wikipedia) is the German-language edition of Wikipedia, a free and publicly editable online encyclopedia.

Founded on 16 March 2001, it is the second-oldest Wikipedia edition (after the English Wikipedia). It has 3,166,849 articles, making it the third-largest edition of Wikipedia by number of articles as of 2026, behind the English Wikipedia and the mostly bot-generated Cebuano Wikipedia. It has the second-largest number of edits and of active users behind the English Wikipedia. On 7 November 2011, the German Wikipedia became the second edition of Wikipedia, after the English edition, to exceed 100 million page edits.

== History ==
=== Early history ===
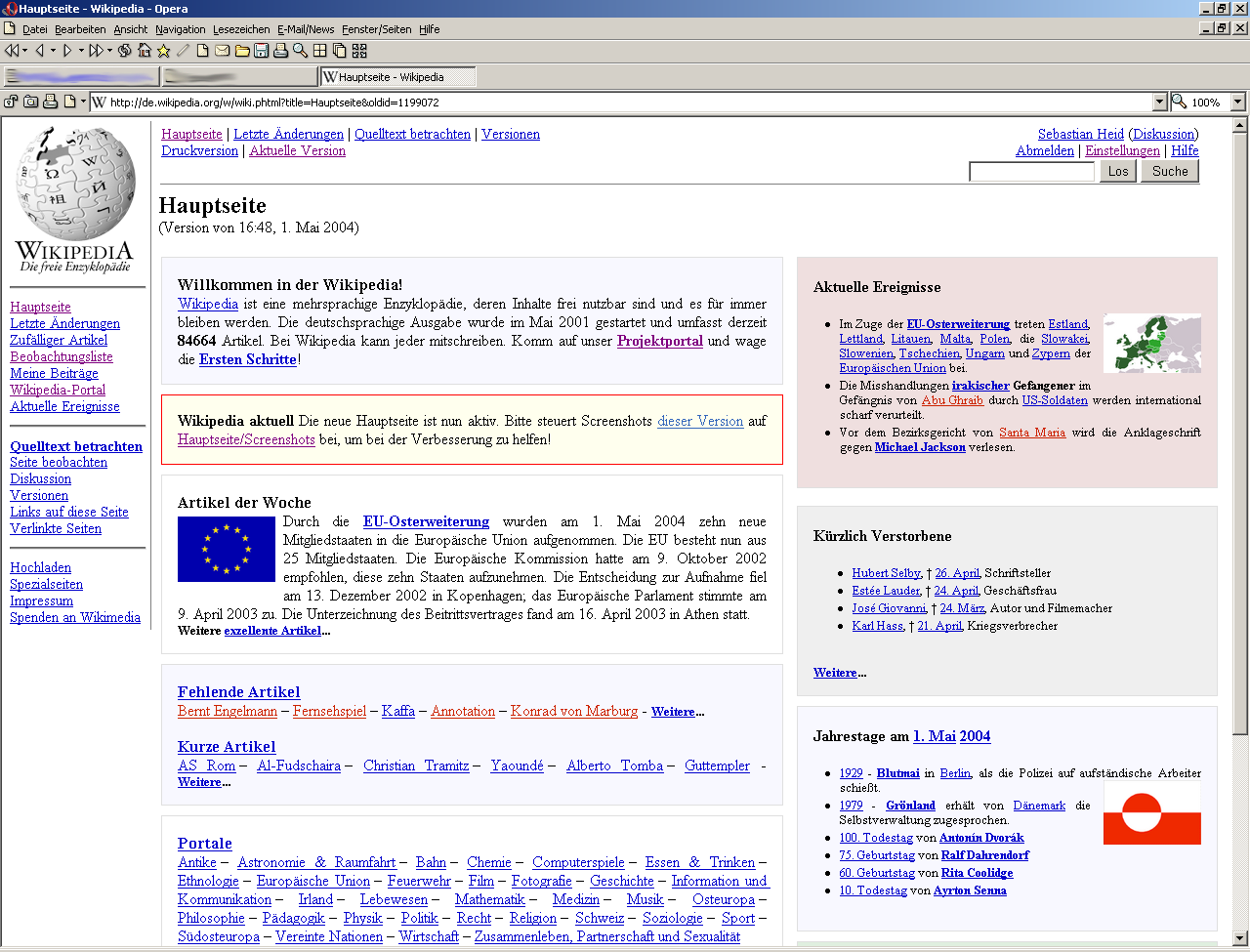
Main Page of the German Wikipedia in May 2004

The German edition of Wikipedia was the first non-English Wikipedia subdomain, and was originally named deutsche.wikipedia.com. Its creation was announced by Jimmy Wales on 16 March 2001. One of the earliest snapshots of the home page, dated 21 March 2001 (revision #9), can be seen at the Wayback Machine site. Aside from the home page, creation of articles in the German Wikipedia started as early as April 2001, apparently with translations of Nupedia articles. After the Catalan Wikipedia, the German Wikipedia was the second non-English edition to contain articles. The earliest article still available on Wikipedia's site is Polymerase-Kettenreaktion, dated May 2001.

Andrew Lih wrote that the hacker culture in Germany and the Verein concept solidified the German Wikipedia's culture. The geography of Europe facilitated face-to-face meetups among German Wikipedians.

=== Growth, coverage and popularity ===
Origin of page viewers (September 2018)
Germany	77.0%
Austria	8.0%
Switzerland	5.4%
United States	1.3%
Other	8.3%

Origin of page edits (October 2012 – September 2013)
Germany	83.4%
Austria	7.0%
Switzerland	4.1%
Italy	0.6%
United States	0.5%
Other	4.4%

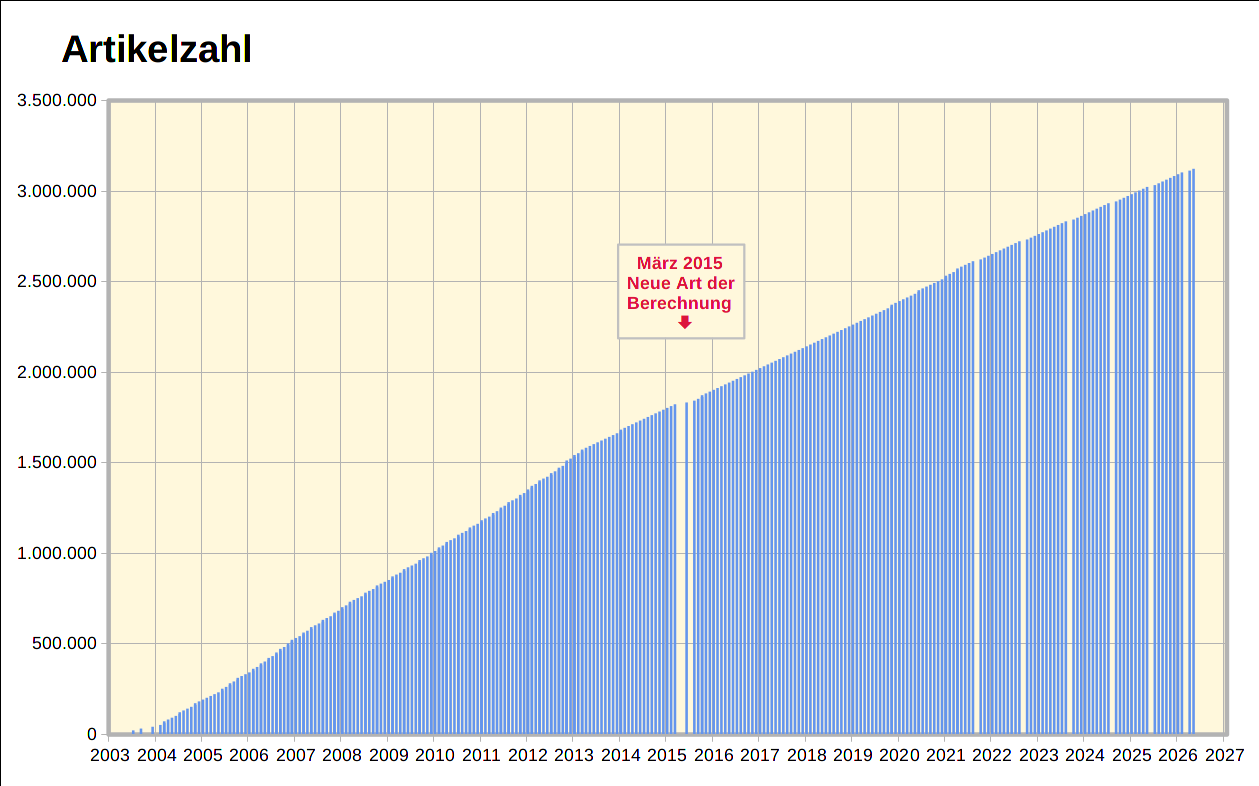
Article growth

On 27 December 2009, the German Wikipedia exceeded 1,000,000 articles, becoming the second edition, after the English-language Wikipedia, to do so. The millionth article was Ernie Wasson. In March 2014, 88% of the edition's articles had more than 512 bytes, 57% had more than 2 kilobytes, and the average article size was 4,298 bytes. As of August 2025, the German Wikipedia has nearly 990,000 biographies and 360,000 disambiguation pages.

As of January 2025, the German Wikipedia is the fourth most viewed language edition of Wikipedia, after the English, Japanese and Russian Wikipedias.

The German edition tends to be selective in its coverage, often rejecting small stubs, articles about individual fictional characters and similar materials. Instead, there is usually one article about all the characters from a specific fictional setting, usually only when the setting is considered important enough (for example, all characters from Star Wars are listed in a single article). A dedicated article about a single fictional entity generally exists only if the character in question has a very significant impact on popular culture (for example, Hercule Poirot). Andrew Lih wrote that German Wikipedia users believe that "having no article at all is better than a very bad article." Therefore, growth on the German Wikipedia leveled before it did for the English Wikipedia, with accelerating growth in article count shifting to constant growth in mid-2006. The number of users signing up for accounts began to steadily decline in 2007 through 2008.

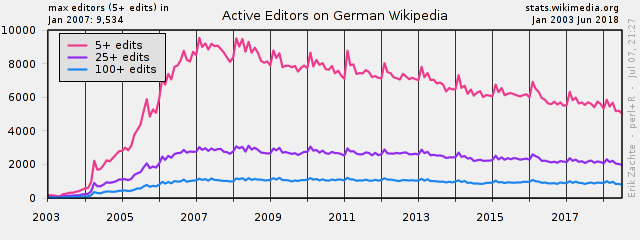
Active editors from 2003–2018; the top curve shows editors with more than five edits per month on content pages.

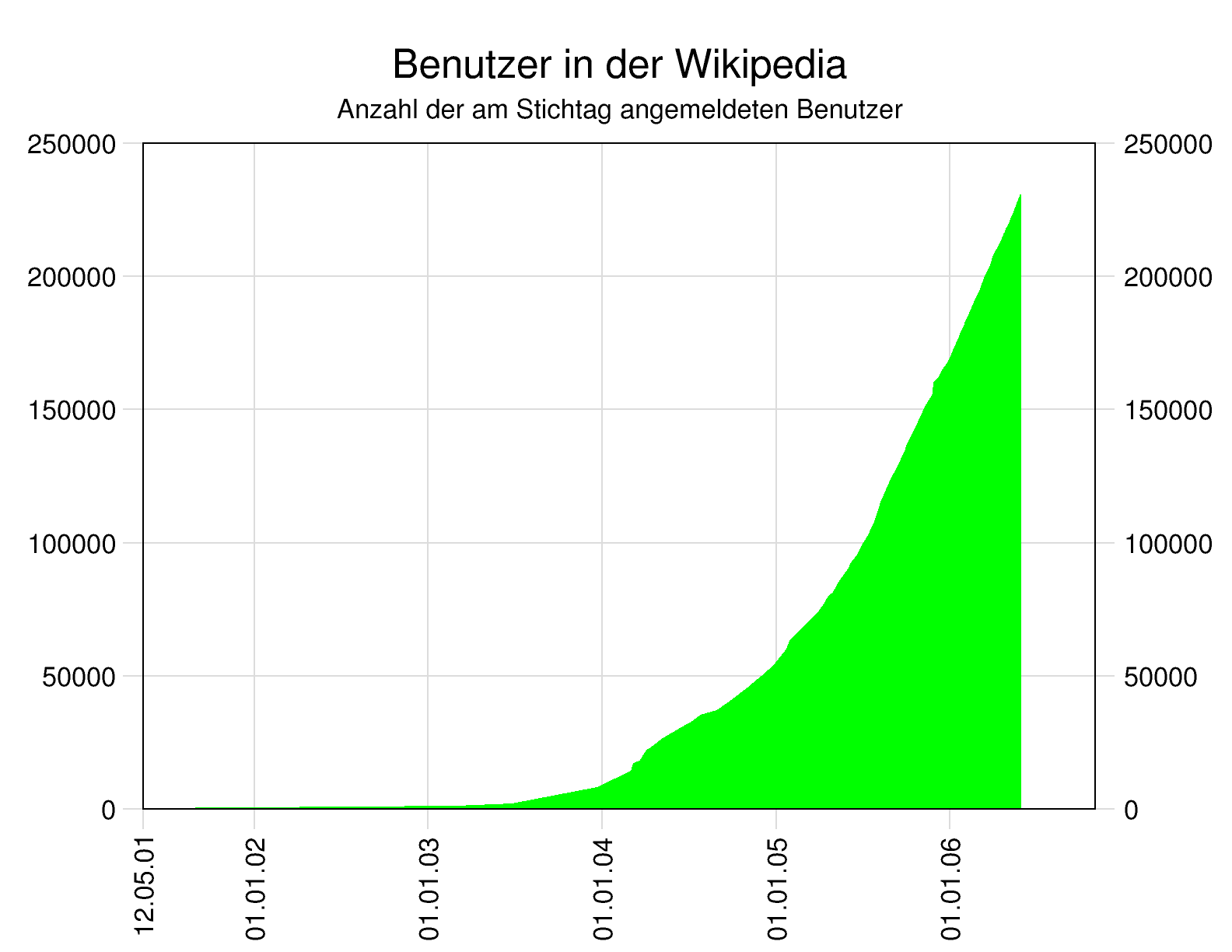
Number of registered users between 2001 and May 2006

The number of volunteer authors began to stagnate in 2007 and has decreased since then. In Germany, the number of regularly active authors fell by more than a third from the peak of 9,254 at the beginning of 2008 to 5,862 at the end of 2015.

The January 2005 Google Zeitgeist announced that "Wikipedia" was the eighth most-searched query on www.google.de. In February 2005, Wikipedia reached third place behind Firefox and Valentine's Day. In June 2005, Wikipedia ranked first.

=== Lack of diversity, decline of authors and paid editing ===
On the 20th anniversary of Wikipedia, the German-language edition faced a number of problems. According to Deutsche Welle, the most significant are a lack of diversity, a decline in active users and the influence of paid editing. While in 2006 there were 8,614 active authors in the German Wikipedia, in December 2018 there were only 5,262. Active Wikipedians only saw about 300 people as the "hard core" of the German Wikipedia who write articles.

As the number of authors decreases, the influence of a few increases, researchers found. The scientist Taha Yasseri describes those authors as "super editors" who write an excessive number of Wikipedia articles and thus keep the community project alive. It is problematic when "super editors" dominate much-discussed articles, build up an elite circle among themselves and "defend" their area.

German Wikipedia has been criticized for conflict-of-interest manipulations by paid editors who overwhelm the small number of administrators.

With the withdrawal of users and an interpretation of the rules that is not always perceived as appropriate, German Wikipedia can hardly counter the influence of lobby groups and paid editing.

As of 2022, the size of the German Wikipedia database is about 6 gigabytes.

== Language and varieties of German ==
Separate Wikipedias have been created for several other varieties of German, including Alemannic German (als:), Luxembourgish (lb:), Pennsylvania German (pdc:), Ripuarian (including Kölsch; ksh:), Yiddish (yi:), Low German (nds:) and Bavarian (bar:). These however, have less popularity than the German Wikipedia. There are also the Dutch Low Saxon (nds-nl:) and the Mennonite Low German Wikipedia.

== Characteristics ==
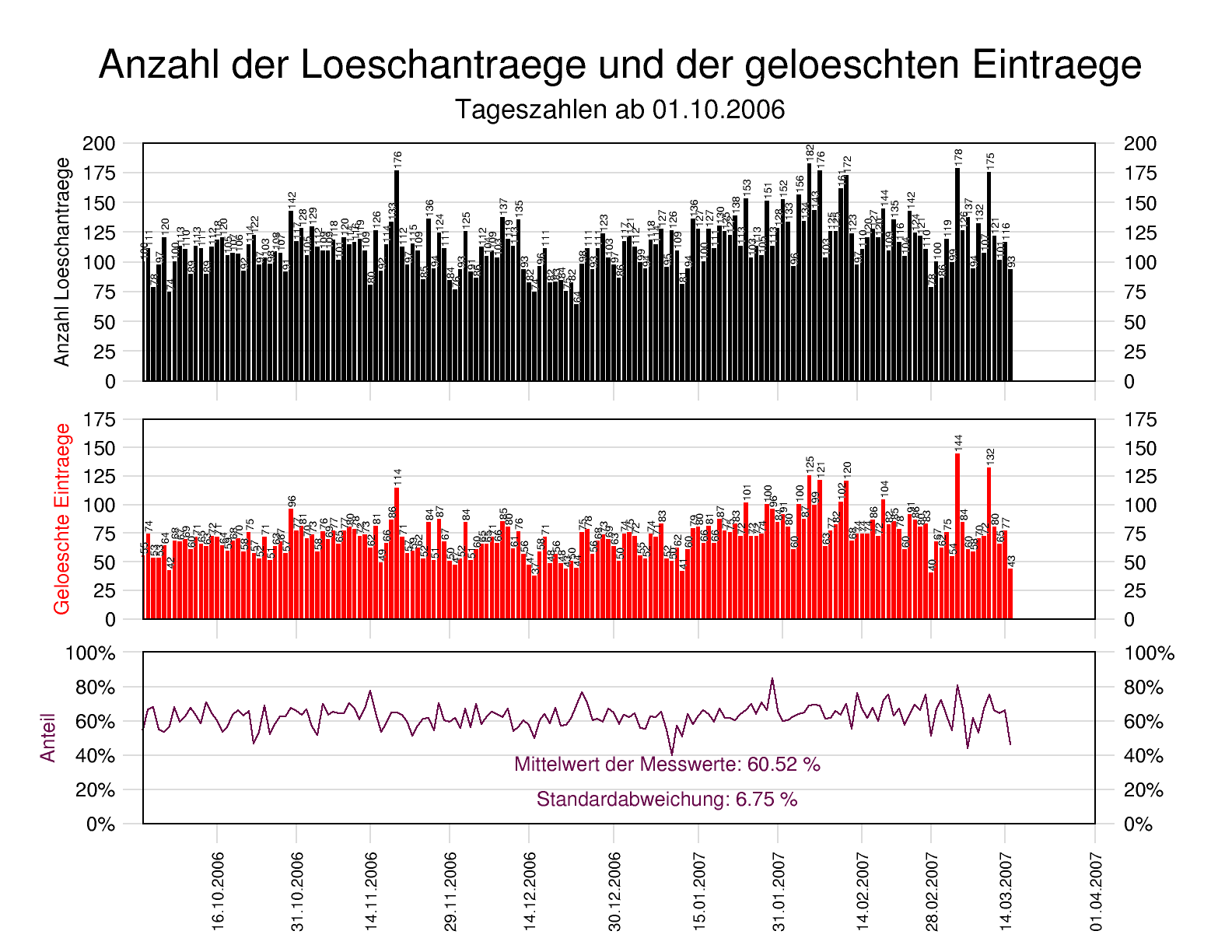
Daily requests for deletion, de facto deleted articles and the ratio of these two values

The German Wikipedia is different from the English Wikipedia (and other Wikipedias) in a number of aspects.

- Compared to the English Wikipedia, different criteria of notability are expressed through the judgments of the editors for deciding if an article about a topic should be allowed. The criteria for notability are more specific; each field has its own specific guidelines.
- There are no fair use provisions. Images and other media that are accepted on the English Wikipedia as fair use may not be suitable for the German Wikipedia.
- The use of scholarly sources, in preference over journalistic and other types of sources, is more strongly encouraged. The German Verifiability (Belege) guideline classifies scholarly sources as inherently more reliable than non-academic sources; the latter's use is only permitted if there is a lack of published academic sources covering a topic.
- In September 2005, Erik Möller voiced concern that "long term page protection is used excessively on the German Wikipedia": on 14 September 2005, 253 pages had been in a fully protected state (only editable by admins) for more than two weeks. This was the highest total of any of the Wikipedias, with the second-highest being 166 pages in the Japanese Wikipedia and 138 in the English Wikipedia. As of May 2008, the German Wikipedia still had the highest percentage of semi-protected articles (articles not editable by unregistered or recently registered users) – 0.281% – among the ten largest Wikipedias, but in terms of the fraction of fully protected articles (0.0261%) it ranked fourth, behind the Japanese, Portuguese and English Wikipedias.
- Articles on indisputably notable subjects may be deleted if they are deemed too short. While the requirements for minimal articles (called stubs) are equivalent, the German and the English Wikipedia differ greatly in the way they are put into practice.
- On 28 December 2005, it was decided to eliminate the Category "stub" (and the corresponding template identifying articles as stubs) from the German Wikipedia.
- Users do not have to create an account in order to start a new article.
- Unlike the Cebuano, Polish, Dutch, Italian, Swedish or many other Wikipedias, the German one does not contain large collections of bot-generated geographical stubs or similar articles. On 2025-10-22 there are just 62 bots.
- The German Wikipedia version did not have an Arbitration Committee until May 2007.
- There is usually no need to classify a person with his or her gender (biological or grammatical), if the gender is undetermined; but in some places like list of female Nobel prize laureates is needed. All nouns are in masculine gender for persons like Bürger, and it will not be written in Bürger*in or other gender-neutral forms.
- The equivalent to the English Wikipedia's featured articles and good articles are exzellente Artikel (excellent articles) and lesenswerte Artikel (lit. 'articles worth reading').
- In 2005, there was a discussion and poll resulting in the decision to phase out the use of local image uploads and to exclusively use Wikimedia Commons for images and other media in the future. The attempt to implement this lasted for about a year and the German "Upload file" page displayed a large pointer to Commons in this time, but since December 2006, there is again a local image upload page without any pointer to Wikimedia Commons. This was prompted by the deletion of images on Commons that are acceptable according to German Wikipedia policies.
- Starting in December 2004, German Wikipedians pioneered Persondata ("Personendaten"), a special format for meta data about persons (name, birth date and place, etc.), introduced in the English Wikipedia in December 2005. In the beginning, the main aim of this system was to aid the search features of the DVD edition of the German Wikipedia (see below). During its introduction in January 2005, Personendaten were added to some 30,000 biographical articles on the live Wikipedia, partly aided by a somewhat automatic tool. As of October 2025, the template is used in more than 1 million articles.
- Like The Signpost in the English Wikipedia, the German Wikipedia also has its own internal newspaper, Kurier. However, the Kurier is laid out on a single page and is not issued weekly but is continually updated by interested Wikipedians, with older articles being archived.

=== Reviewed versions ===
At Wikimania 2006, Jimmy Wales announced that the German Wikipedia would institute a system of "stable article versions", also known as Flagged Revisions, on a trial basis. The system went live in May 2008. Certain users, so-called "active sighters", are now able to mark article versions as "reviewed", indicating that the text contains no obvious vandalism. A note in the top right corner of the screen indicates to the reader whether or not the present version of an article has already been reviewed, and provides access to the most recent reviewed version or a more current, unreviewed version as needed.

The German Wikipedia has two levels of sighting status which act like the English Wikipedia's pending changes protection: Passive sighter and Active sighter. The former is able to make changes to articles go live immediately if the last edit is marked as sighted, while only the latter allows manually reviewing pending changes.

== Miscellanea ==
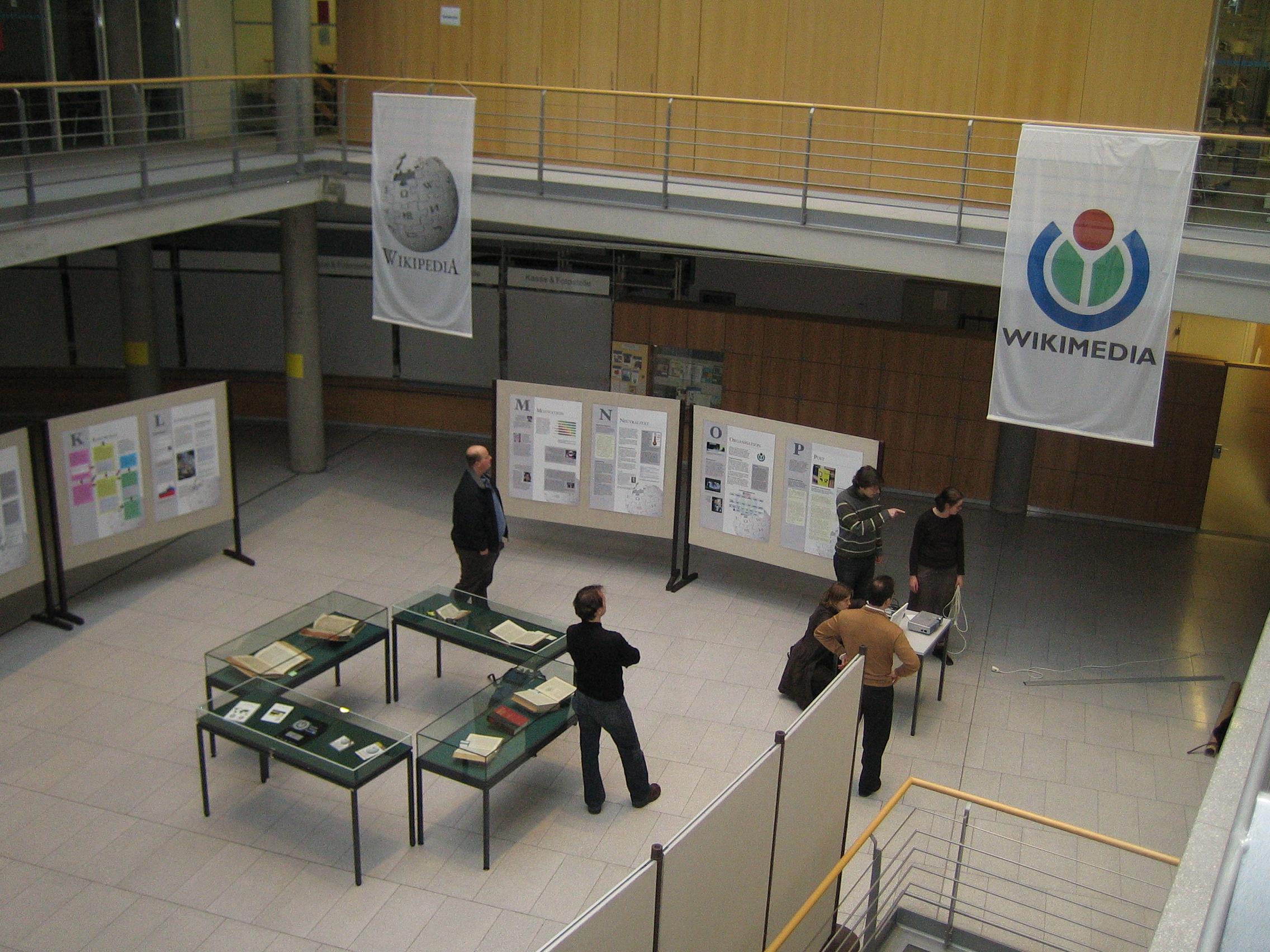
The exhibition, "Five Years of Wikipedia", at the University of Göttingen library, March 2006

=== Events ===
The first real-life meetup of Wikipedians took place in October 2003 in Munich. As a result of this meeting, regularly striking round tables (called "Wikipedia-Stammtisch") established themselves at various places in Germany, Austria and Switzerland. The round tables have become an important aspect of collegial exchange within the German-speaking community.

Each spring and autumn, the German Wikipedia organizes a writing contest, where a community-elected jury rates nominated articles. Prizes are sponsored by individual community members and companies. The first contest was held in October 2004 – the article Kloster Lehnin (Lehnin Abbey) was selected as the winner from 44 nominated articles. The second contest, held in March 2005, saw 52 contributions, and the third, in September 2005, 70. A trial to extend the contest to an international level met with limited success, with only the Dutch, English and Japanese Wikipedias participating.

For the March 2006 writing contest, the 150 nominated articles were split into three sections: history and society (56 nominations), arts and humanities (36), and science (46). The article on the Brown Bear (German: Braunbär) won, and of the nominated 27 articles reached featured status a few weeks after the contest. In March 2007, the sixth contest was held, with the winner being the article on the Hague Convention for the Protection of Cultural Property in the Event of Armed Conflict (German: Haager Konvention zum Schutz von Kulturgut bei bewaffneten Konflikten).

German Wikipedians organized the first international Wikipedia conference, Wikimania 2005, in August 2005 in Frankfurt. Some 300 people from over 50 countries attended the three-day conference.

From 17 March to 15 April 2006, the Göttingen State and University Library held a special exhibition documenting the first five years of Wikipedia.

In 2006, the University of Göttingen hosted the first Wikipedia Academy. The academy was intended to familiarize the academic world with Wikimedia projects. In 2007, the second such meeting took place, organized in conjunction with the Akademie der Wissenschaften und der Literatur (Academy of Science and Literature) in Mainz as part of the German Jahr der Geisteswissenschaften (Year of the Humanities), which was decreed by the German Federal Ministry for Education and Research. A third meeting was organized on 20–21 June 2008 in Berlin, during the Jahr der Mathematik (Year of Mathematics); the meeting was hosted by the Berlin-Brandenburg Academy of Sciences and Humanities.

German Wikipedians have since organised the Foto-Workshop meeting of photographers, with participants from 10 countries.

=== Contacts with Brockhaus ===
In April 2004, a complete list of article titles from the leading German encyclopedia Brockhaus was uploaded to the German Wikipedia, in an apparent attempt to facilitate the creation of missing articles. A representative of Brockhaus asked for and obtained the deletion of what was believed to be a copyright infringement. As a result of the developing email conversation, a group of five Wikipedians visited the "new media" group of Brockhaus in Mannheim on 1 July 2004. The friendly meeting saw a lively discussion of the differing approaches to writing an encyclopedia; it became clear that Brockhaus had closely observed Wikipedia for quite some time.

=== Subsidies from the German government ===
In June 2007, a project on renewable resources (WikiProjekt Nachwachsende Rohstoffe) was initiated, the goal being to write and improve articles on the topic. The project was run for three years and was subsidized by the German Ministry of Agriculture with approximately €80,000 a year. It was organised and managed by the private company "nova-Institut GmbH". Nova GmbH and Wikimedia Deutschland e. V. funded the project with approximately €60,000 a year in addition, so the budget was approximately €420,000 in total.

These funds were mainly used to organise the project and also to search for experts in the field who have not contributed to Wikipedia yet. Nova may also have paid expense allowances to authors.

=== Most-disputed articles ===
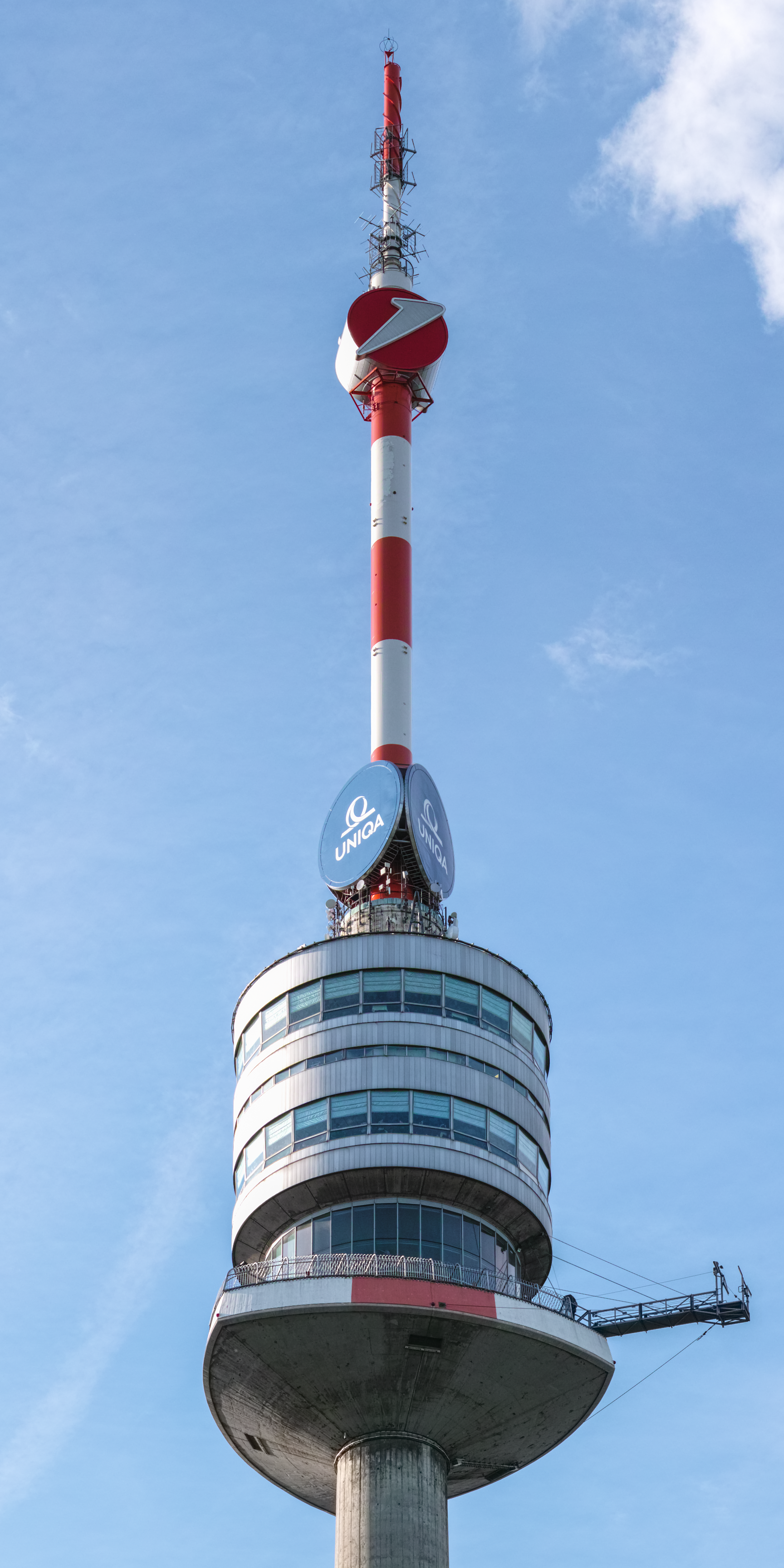
The observation decks and spire of the Donauturm

According to a 2013 Oxford University study, the article on Croatia was the most disputed article on the German Wikipedia. The top ten most disputed articles then also included Adolf Hitler, Scientology, and Rudolf Steiner. One of the largest disputes about simple sentences, however, concerned the Donauturm in Vienna. Whilst the observation tower shares some architectural aspects with the Fernsehturm Stuttgart, it was never planned for TV broadcasting purposes. The German Wikipedia had a rather lengthy (about 600,000 characters) discussion about the suitable title and categories, inasmuch as numerous Austrian authors denied the description of Donauturm as a "TV tower". The Spiegel coverage of the issue cited a participant with "On good days, Wikipedia is better than any TV soap".

== Reviews and research ==
In September 2004, the computer magazine c't compared the German Wikipedia with the Brockhaus Multimedia encyclopedia and the German edition of Microsoft's Encarta. On a scale from 0 to 5, Wikipedia ranked first with a score of 3.4. A few weeks later, the weekly newspaper Die Zeit also compared content from Wikipedia with other reference works and found that Wikipedia only has to "share its lead position in the field of natural science." The DVD version of Spring 2005 received a rather negative review by Björn Hoffmann – product manager working for the Bibliographisches Institut & F.A. Brockhaus in July 2005.

In November 2005 the OpenUsability project in cooperation with the Berlin-based Relevantive AG conducted a usability test of the German Wikipedia. The study focused on finding information and included a set of recommendations to change the MediaWiki interface. In February 2006, the open usability project led a second test which focused on the experience of new editors. The reports were published in English.

A second test by c't in February 2007 used 150 search terms, of which 56 were closely evaluated, to compare four digital encyclopedias: Bertelsmann Enzyklopädie 2007, Brockhaus Multimedial premium 2007, Encarta 2007 Enzyklopädie and Wikipedia. With respect to concerns about the reliability of Wikipedia, it concluded: "We did not find more errors in the texts of the free encyclopedia than in those of its commercial competitors".

In December 2007, German magazine Stern published the results of a comparison between the German Wikipedia and the online version of the 15-volume edition of Brockhaus Enzyklopädie. The test was commissioned to a research institute (Cologne-based WIND GmbH), whose analysts assessed 50 articles from each encyclopedia (covering politics, business, sports, science, culture, entertainment, geography, medicine, history and religion) on four criteria (accuracy, completeness, timeliness and clarity), and judged Wikipedia articles to be more accurate on average (1.6 on a scale from 1 to 6, versus 2.3 for Brockhaus with lower = better). Wikipedia's coverage was also found to be more complete and up to date; however, Brockhaus was judged to be more clearly written, while several Wikipedia articles were criticized as being too complicated for non-experts, and many as too lengthy.

In 2015, a group of young historians reviewed the Massaker von Katyn article, which was deemed "excellent" by Wikipedia authors. They pointed out more than 130 factual errors and remarked that the article completely ignores new scientific literature.

== Off-line publication ==
=== CD November 2004 ===
In November 2004, Directmedia Publishing GmbH started distributing a CD-ROM containing a German Wikipedia snapshot. Some 40,000 CDs were sent to registered customers of directmedia. The price was 3 euros per CD.

The display and search software used for the project, Digibib, had been developed by Directmedia Publishing for earlier publications; it ran on Windows and Mac OS X (and later also on Linux). The Wikipedia articles had to be converted to the XML format used by Digibib.

To produce the CD, a dump of the live Wikipedia had been copied to a separate server, where a team of 70 Wikipedians vetted the material, deleting nonsense articles and obvious copyright violations. Questionable articles were added to a special list, to be reviewed later. The final CD contained 132,000 articles and 1,200 images.

The ISO image was distributed for free via eMule and BitTorrent. In December, the CHIP computer magazine placed the Wikipedia data on the DVD that it distributes with every issue. The Wikipedia materials are published under GFDL while the Digibib software may only be copied for non-commercial use, except the Linux version which is GPLed.

=== CD/DVD April 2005 ===
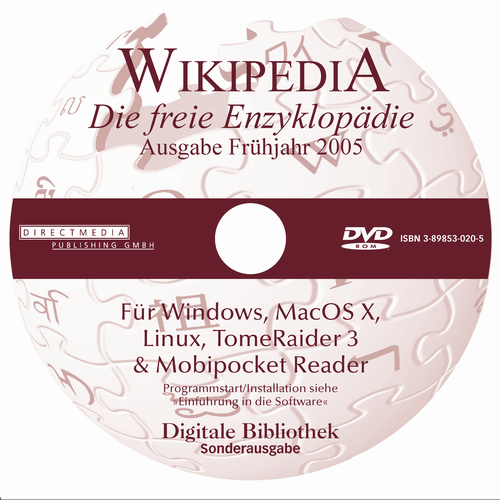
DVD label of German off-line Wikipedia publication

A new release of Wikipedia content was published by Directmedia on 6 April 2005. This package consisted of a 2.7 GB DVD and a separate bootable CDROM (running a version of Linux with Firefox). The CDROM did not contain all the data, but was included to accommodate users without DVD-drives. The DVD used Directmedia's Digibib software and article format; everything could be installed to a hard drive. In addition, the DVD contained an HTML tree, as well as Wikipedia articles formatted for use with PDAs (specifically, the Mobipocket and TomeRaider formats).

The production of the DVD motivated the Personendaten project (see above).

The vetting process was similar to the one for the CD described above and took place on a separate MediaWiki server. The process took about a week and involved 33 Wikipedians, communicating on IRC. To prevent duplication of work, editors would protect every article that they had reviewed; links to protected articles were shown in green. Lists of potential spammed or vandalized articles had been produced ahead of time with SQL queries. Unacceptable articles were simply deleted on the spot. While the XML articles for the earlier CD version had been produced from HTML, this time a script was used to convert Wiki markup directly to the Digibib format. The final DVD contained about 205,000 articles, with every article linking to a list of contributors.

Directmedia sold 30,000 DVDs, at €9.90 each. This price included 16% taxes and a one-euro donation to Wikimedia Deutschland; production costs were about €2. The DVD image can also be downloaded for free.

Following the successful launch of the DVD, Directmedia donated high-resolution pictures of 10,000 public domain paintings to Wikimedia Commons (see related Signpost story).

=== DVD/book December 2005 ===
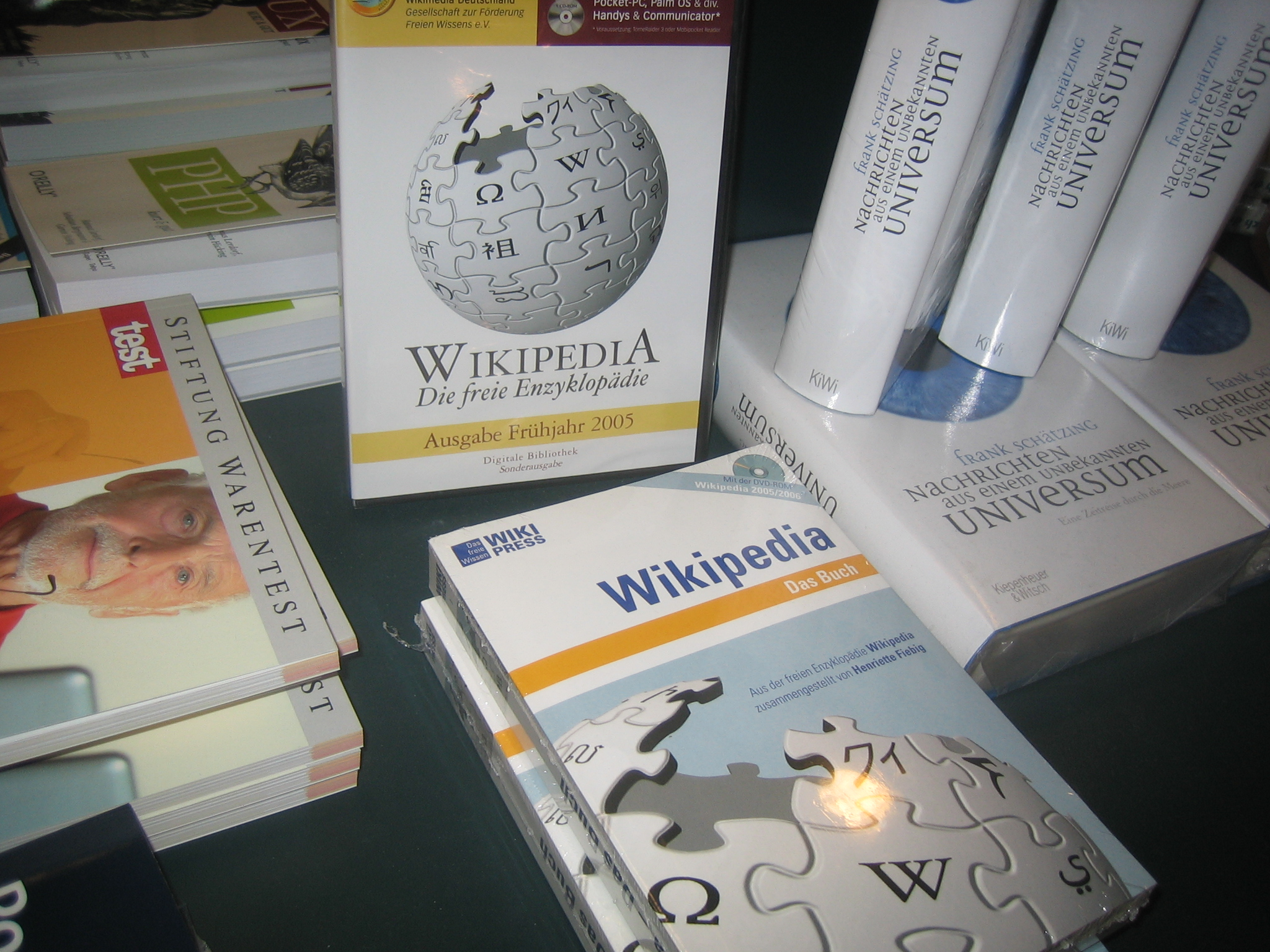
The 2005 DVD/book version of German Wikipedia

The next edition of Wikipedia content was issued in December 2005 by the publisher Zenodot Verlagsgesellschaft mbH, a sister company of Directmedia. A 139-page book explaining Wikipedia, its history and policies was accompanied by a 7.5 GB DVD containing 300,000 articles and 100,000 images. The book with DVD is sold for €9.90; both are also available for free download.

The vetting process for this version was different and did not involve human intervention. A "white list" of trusted Wikipedians was assembled, the last 10 days of every article's history were examined, and the last version edited by a white-listed Wikipedian was chosen for the DVD. If no such version existed, the last version older than 10 days was used. Articles nominated for cleanup or deletion were not used.

=== DVD December 2006/2007 and 2007/2008 ===
The December 2006 – 2007 and 2007–2008 edition can be downloaded from dvd.wikimedia.org.

=== Books ===
==== Wikipress series ====
The December 2005 book about Wikipedia was the first in a series titled Wikipress. These books, published by Zenodot, consisted of a collection of Wikipedia articles about a common topic, selected and edited by so-called "Wikipeditors" who may receive compensation from Directmedia. The books were assembled on a separate server from those used for the regular German Wikipedia pages. Every Wikipress book was accompanied by an "edit card", a post card that readers could send in to edit the book's contents. Wikipress books about the Nobel Peace Prize, bicycles, Antarctica, the Solar System, and Hip hop, amongst others, were released, and other books on topics as diverse as Whales, Conspiracy theories, Manga, Astrophysics, and the Red Cross were in the works. Due to lack of interest, the project was ended after a few books.

==== 100 volume Wikipedia ====
The publisher Zenodot announced in January 2006 that they intend to publish the complete German Wikipedia in print, 100 volumes with 800 pages each, starting with the letter A in October 2006, followed by two volumes each month thereafter, to end with Z in 2010. The project, code named WP 1.0, was to be supported by 25 editors employed by Zenodot as well as a scientific advisory board. Changes made to articles before publication would also be available for incorporation into the online Wikipedia.

In March 2006, Zenodot organized a "community day" to meet with Wikipedians and discuss the project. Groups of Wikipedians had already begun to polish articles with titles Aa-Af in selected topics. In late March it was announced that the project was put on hold and no books would be published in 2006; the reason given was that community support was lacking.

==== Bertelsmann ====
On 22 April 2008, the publisher Bertelsmann announced that it planned to publish a one-volume encyclopedia in September using content from the German-language Wikipedia. The volume was planned to include abbreviated entries for the 50,000 most commonly used search terms of the prior two years. The book is priced at 19.95 euros, with one euro from every sale going to the German chapter of the Wikimedia Foundation. It was released on 15 September 2008 in hardcover, containing 992 pages and many illustrations.

== Legal issues and controversies ==
=== Deletions ===
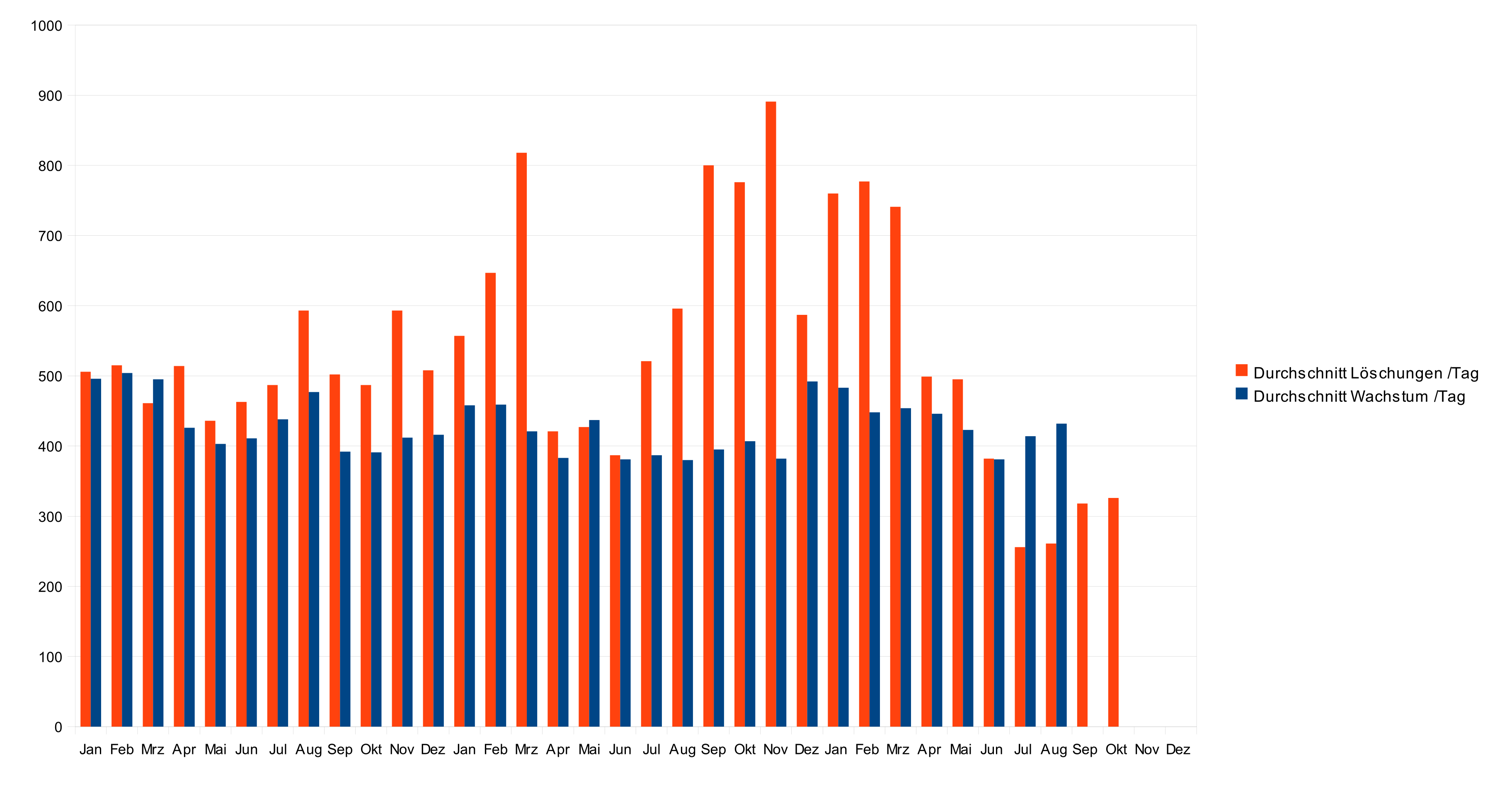
Comparison of the number of new articles and deletions in the German Wikipedia between January 2008 and October 2010

The German Wikipedia has been criticized for the deletion of articles because they seem "irrelevant" to those who deleted them, even though they seem expedient, meaningful, well written and extensive enough to other people. These discussions have received press coverage in computer magazines as well as in mainstream media.

=== Unauthorized uses ===
While everyone is free to use Wikipedia content, there are certain conditions, such as attribution, a copy of the license text and no non-free derivative works (see Creative Commons licenses and GNU Free Documentation License for details).

In March 2005, the German news magazine Der Spiegel published an article on the Rwandan genocide in its online edition; it was a copy of Wikipedia's article. The article was taken down soon after and replaced with an apology.

In April 2005, the encyclopedia Brockhaus published an article about the new pope Josef Ratzinger in its online edition. Because of its close similarity to Wikipedia's article, suspicion arose right away that the Brockhaus article might have been plagiarism. The article was removed soon after but Brockhaus did not apologize or admit guilt (see The Signpost's coverage).

=== Large-scale copyright infringement (2003–2005) ===
In mid-November 2005, it was discovered that an anonymous user had entered hundreds of articles from older encyclopedias that had been published from the 1960s to the 1980s in East Germany. The articles were mainly on topics in philosophy and related areas. The user had started in December 2003.

A press release was issued and numerous editors started to remove the copyright protected materials. This was made difficult by the fact that the old encyclopedias were not online and not easily available from many West German libraries, and that the user had used numerous different IP addresses. The Directmedia DVD had to be updated.

=== Bertrand Meyer article hoax ===
On 28 December 2005, the article about computer scientist Bertrand Meyer (creator of the Eiffel programming language) was edited by an anonymous user, falsely reporting that Meyer had died four days earlier. The hoax was reported five days later by the Heise News Ticker and the article was immediately corrected. Major news media in Germany and Switzerland picked up on the story. Meyer himself went on to publish a positive evaluation of Wikipedia, concluding, "The system succumbed to one of its potential flaws, and quickly healed itself. This doesn't affect the big picture. Just like those about me, rumors about Wikipedia's downfall have been grossly exaggerated."

=== Naming Tron ===
In 2006, Wikimedia Deutschland, the German chapter of the US Wikimedia Foundation, was drawn into a legal dispute between the parents of the deceased German computer hacker Boris "Tron" Floricic and the Foundation. The parents did not wish Floricic's real name to be publicly mentioned, and in December 2005 they obtained a preliminary injunction in a Berlin court against the American Wikimedia Foundation, requiring removal of Floricic's name from Wikipedia. The name was not removed. On 19 January 2006 they obtained a second injunction, this time against Wikimedia Deutschland, prohibiting the address www.wikipedia.de (which is under control of Wikimedia Deutschland) to redirect to the German Wikipedia at de.wikipedia.org (which is controlled by the Wikimedia Foundation and hosts the actual encyclopedia) as long as Wikipedia mentioned Floricic's name. Wikimedia Deutschland complied and replaced the redirect with a note explaining the situation, but without mentioning the Tron case specifically. The German Wikipedia remained accessible through de.wikipedia.org during this time. One day later, Wikimedia Deutschland achieved a suspension of the injunction, and linked from the note at www.wikipedia.de to the German Wikipedia. On 9 February, the court invalidated the injunction, ruling that neither the rights of the deceased nor the rights of the parents were affected by publishing the name; this ruling was upheld on appeal, decided 12 May.

=== Lutz Heilmann controversy ===
In November 2008, Lutz Heilmann, a member of the German parliament, obtained a preliminary injunction against Wikimedia Deutschland e. V., forbidding the forwarding of www.wikipedia.de to de.wikipedia.org. According to Focus Online, Heilmann objected to claims that he had not completed his university degree, and that he had participated in a business venture involving pornography. The report also suggests that the Wikipedia article had been repeatedly altered in line with his claims by an anonymous user operating within the Bundestag building, but Heilmann denied having been involved in an edit war. Wikimedia Germany displayed a page explaining the situation. Heilmann announced on 16 November that he would drop the legal proceedings against Wikimedia Deutschland, regretting that many uninvolved users of the encyclopedia had been affected.

=== Superprotect and Media Viewer controversy ===
In 2014, the Wikimedia Foundation (WMF) "superprotected" a JavaScript file on German Wikipedia so that no German editors, not even administrators, were allowed to edit it. This was in response towards controversy surrounding the new Media Viewer (see The Signpost's coverage). Many German editors left over this dispute. An open letter to the WMF was signed by almost 1,000 Wikimedians. In April 2015 Erik Möller left the WMF; the "superprotect" feature was disabled in November.

=== Reiss Engelhorn Museum ===
In 2015, the Reiss Engelhorn Museum sued the WMF and its German chapter Wikimedia Deutschland for alleged copyright violations of 17 public domain pictures.

== Parodies and forks ==
In the millennium years, parodies of the German Wikipedia include Kamelopedia, created in April 2004, Stupidedia, created in December 2004, and the German version of Uncyclopedia, created in August 2005.

Ulrich Fuchs, an active early contributor to the German Wikipedia, produced a fork known as Wikiweise in April 2005. It was ad-supported, used its own software (but a similar wiki markup), admitted only registered editors, and prominently displayed the real names of every article's major contributors. It has since gone offline.

== Copyright law ==
On 21 March 2019, the German Wikipedia went offline to inform users about the European Union's copyright law reformation, the Directive on Copyright in the Digital Single Market, which had been voted on in the European Parliament on 27 March 2019. Opponents of the reformation were concerned about the restriction of fundamental rights including a free press and the freedom of speech and arts. The blackouts' purpose was to both inform and protest this controversial decision.

== Sources ==
- Lih, Andrew (2009). The Wikipedia Revolution (First ed.). New York City: Hyperion. ISBN 978-1-4013-0371-6.
