= VisualEditor =

Rich-text editor for MediaWiki wikis

- VisualEditor logo, set in Gill Sans

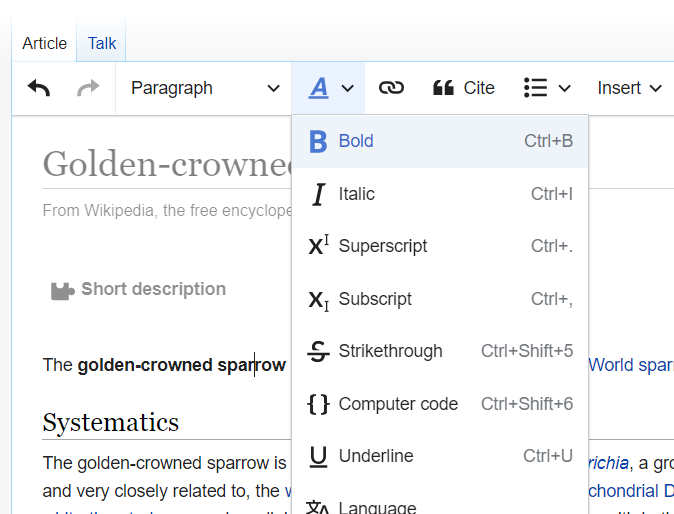
- VisualEditor's text formatting menu
- Developers: Wikimedia Foundation and Fandom, Inc.
- Written in: JavaScript, Node.js, PHP
- Operating system: Cross-platform
- Platform: MediaWiki extension
- Type: Wiki
- License: MIT
- Website: www.mediawiki.org/wiki/VisualEditor
- Repository: gerrit.wikimedia.org/g/mediawiki/extensions/VisualEditor

VisualEditor (VE) is an online rich-text editor for MediaWiki-wikis that provides a way to edit pages based on the WYSIWYG (what you see is what you get) principle. It was developed by the Wikimedia Foundation in partnership with Fandom. In July 2013, it was enabled by default on several of the largest Wikipedia projects. By 2020, VisualEditor was enabled by default on most Wikipedia and Wikivoyage language editions.

The Wikimedia Foundation considered it the most challenging feature to date, and The Economist called it Wikipedia's "most significant change" in 2011. According to The Daily Dot, the Wikimedia Foundation's pursuit of wider participation may regret alienating existing editors. In September 2013, English Wikipedia's VisualEditor was changed from opt-out to opt-in, following user complaints, but it was returned to being available by default (for new registered users only) in October 2015 after more development. A 2015 study by the Wikimedia Foundation found that VisualEditor failed to provide the anticipated benefits for new editors.

VisualEditor is bundled with every MediaWiki release since version 1.35, released in September 2020.

== Development ==
'Editing makes me feel stupid' - user tests commissioned by the Wikimedia Foundation from 2009 which demonstrate the difficulty that ordinary users were having with editing wikitext, MediaWiki's markup language.

In a presentation from Wikimania 2013, the team developing the software presented it to attendees.

The original web-based Wikipedia editor provided by MediaWiki is a plain browser-based text editor, also called 'Source editor', where authors have to learn the wiki markup language to edit. A what you see is what you get editor for Wikipedia had been planned for years in order to remove the need to learn the wiki markup language. It was hoped this would reduce the technical hurdle for would-be Wikipedians, enabling wider participation in editing, and was an attempt to reverse the decline in editor numbers of 50,000 in 2006 to 35,000 in 2011, having peaked in 2007. It was part of a $1m project aimed at developing new features and making improvements. A goal of the project is to allow both the former wiki markup editing and editing with the WYSIWYG VisualEditor. According to Wikimedia Foundation's Jay Walsh, the hope is to redress under-represented contributions from Arabic, Portuguese, and Indic-language versions of the site. (Note: Respective Wikipedia websites: Arabic, Portuguese and Indic languages' Urdu, Hindi, Bihari, Gujarati)

According to Wikimedia Foundation, "There are various reasons that lead existing and prospective contributors not to edit; among them, the complexity of wiki markup is a major issue. One of VisualEditor's goals is to empower knowledgeable and good-faith users to edit and become valuable members of the community, even if they're not wiki markup experts. We also hope that, with time, experienced editors will find VisualEditor useful for some of their editing tasks." In 2012, Sue Gardner, the executive director of the Wikimedia Foundation, said "we don't think that the visual editor, in and of itself, is going to solve the challenge", and Wikipedia co-founder Jimmy Wales remarked "This is epically important".

=== Rollout ===
MediaWiki is used by numerous wikis, with smaller sites originally conceived as being rolled out first. VisualEditor was planned to be rolled out on the English-language Wikipedia for editors with registered accounts, and then for anonymous editors. The alpha version was made available to select users in December 2012, widened to all registered users in April. It was in beta in July 2013, when it was made the default editor for users logged-into the English-language Wikipedia. It was subsequently made opt-in on the English-language Wikipedia in September 2013 due to community complaints over its stability, and implementation was buggy and had limitations (though it remained active for most non-English Wikipedias). IEEE Spectrum reported that the bumpy rollout led to experienced editors leaving the site. In 2015, it completed its beta development phase and was again made available on English Wikipedia.

=== Recent development ===
In October 2025, Wikimedia announced testing of Paste Check, an Edit Check feature that asks editors to identify the origin and licensing of text pasted into an article, on 22 wikis. It also announced a link in the categories box that opens VisualEditor’s category dialog for logged-in users.

=== Technical ===
The Wikimedia Foundation joined forces with Wikia to work on the project. The implementation encountered challenges with the wiki markup language (the basis for Wikipedia articles), due to it being continuously extended over 12 years to include seldom-used rich and complex features making reproduction of the final article appearance dependent on many factors that were not easy to reproduce. The technical implementation required improvements to MediaWiki in parsing, wiki markup language, the DOM and final HTML conversion. A necessary component is a parser called Parsoid which was created to convert in both directions between wikitext and a format suitable for VisualEditor. The Wikimedia Foundation considered VisualEditor its most challenging technical project to date.

In December 2019, Wikimedia replaced the original JavaScript implementation of Parsoid with a PHP implementation. Since MediaWiki 1.35, both VisualEditor and Parsoid have been bundled with MediaWiki, rather than requiring a separately installed Parsoid service.

==== Online rich-text editor ====
According to the VisualEditor team, the aim is "to create a reliable rich-text editor for MediaWiki", a "visual editor" which is "WYSIWYG-like". The implementation is split into a "core" online rich-text editor which can run independently of MediaWiki, and a MediaWiki extension.

== Response ==
Responses to the introduction of the VisualEditor have greatly varied, with The Economist's L.M. calling it "the most significant change in Wikipedia's short history" in 2011.

=== Opposition ===
Some editors expressed concerns about the rollout and bugs, with the German Wikipedia community deciding to use an opt-in model instead of an opt-out one in 2013. Irish Wikipedia administrator Oliver Moran, echoing concerns of other editors, said that users may feel belittled by the implication that "certain people" are confused by wiki markup and therefore need the VisualEditor, comparing the learning of wikitext favorably to Twitter's hashtag and @ (at sign) mention syntax.

Three months after the rollout of the VisualEditor to the English Wikipedia, The Daily Dot reported that the Wikimedia Foundation had experienced backlash from long-time editors who deemed the editor "buggy and untested". Following discourse between the community and the foundation, Wikipedia administrator Kww overrode the foundation's rollout, making it opt-in, instead of opt-out. The Foundation did not revert the change, instead committing to further improving VisualEditor.

=== Support ===
Softpedia ran an article titled "Wikipedia's New VisualEditor Is the Best Update in Years and You Can Make It Better". The Register said that the update brings the foundation "a little closer to its goal of making it easier for anyone to create and edit Wikipedia articles." Engadget reported that editors had been "dropping like flies" given the complexity of wiki markup before VisualEditor.

=== Research results ===
Aaron Halfaker, a research scientist at the Wikimedia Foundation, ran a controlled study on the effects of VisualEditor in May 2015. The study found that VisualEditor did not increase editor productivity, however reducing the burden upon existing editors. Editing took 18 seconds longer with VisualEditor before hitting save, and new editors were less likely to save their work. Halfaker however did ascribe these negative results as from editors testing the new system, not any real struggle. A previous June 2013 controlled test—when VisualEditor was less mature—showed similar neutral and negative results.

== See also ==
- List of HTML editors § WYSIWYG editors
