= Wikipedia coverage of death =

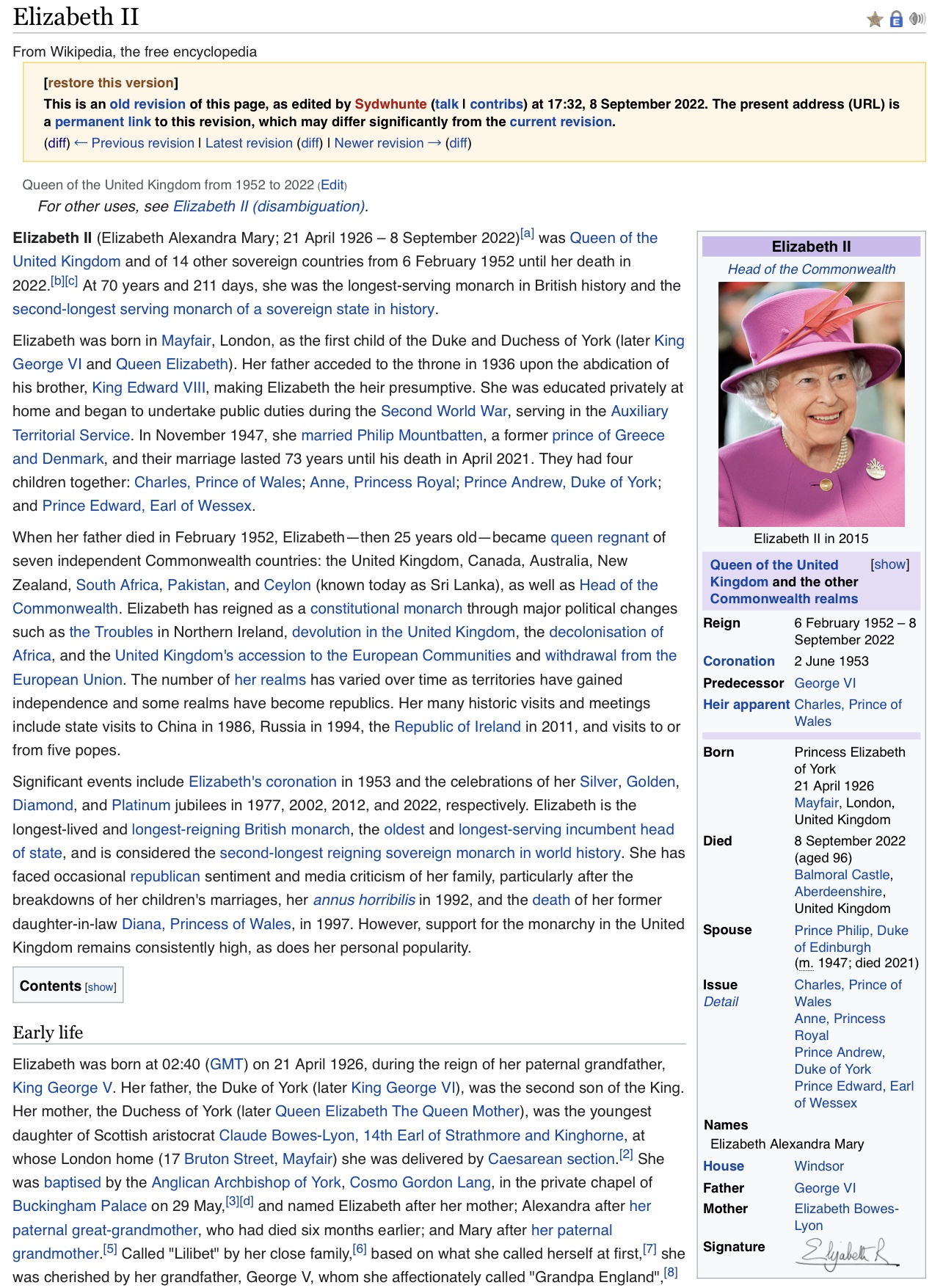
Sydwhunte was the first to update the Elizabeth II Wikipedia article following her death.

The volunteer editors of the online encyclopedia Wikipedia tend to update Wikipedia articles with information about deaths quickly after people die — for example, changing 'is' to 'was' in the opening sentence. Web developer and Wikipedia editor Hay Kranen coined the term "deaditor" to refer to these editors. Articles about people often have large spikes in views just after they die. For example, the article about designer Kate Spade averaged 2,117 views in 48-hour periods before her death. In the 48 hours after her death, it got 3,417,416, an increase of 161,427%.

Media have remarked on the site's quick updates after the deaths of people such as Michael Jackson, Elizabeth II, and Henry Kissinger. Sometimes the "lead-image" in an article about a dead celebrity will be changed to a picture meant to represent that person's life and career.

In January 2009, in response to false death reports on the English Wikipedia articles about Robert Byrd and Edward Kennedy, the site's co-founder Jimmy Wales proposed that pages be moderated using Flagged Revisions, a form of protection under which certain revisions of a protected page must be accepted by an experienced editor before becoming visible to readers. The feature, known as "pending changes" on English Wikipedia, was first implemented in 2010, though by 2021, it was not widely used on biographies of living people and was unmaintained.

When a subject of a biography dies of a disease, its progress may also be described.
