= Stupidedia =

Humorous German website

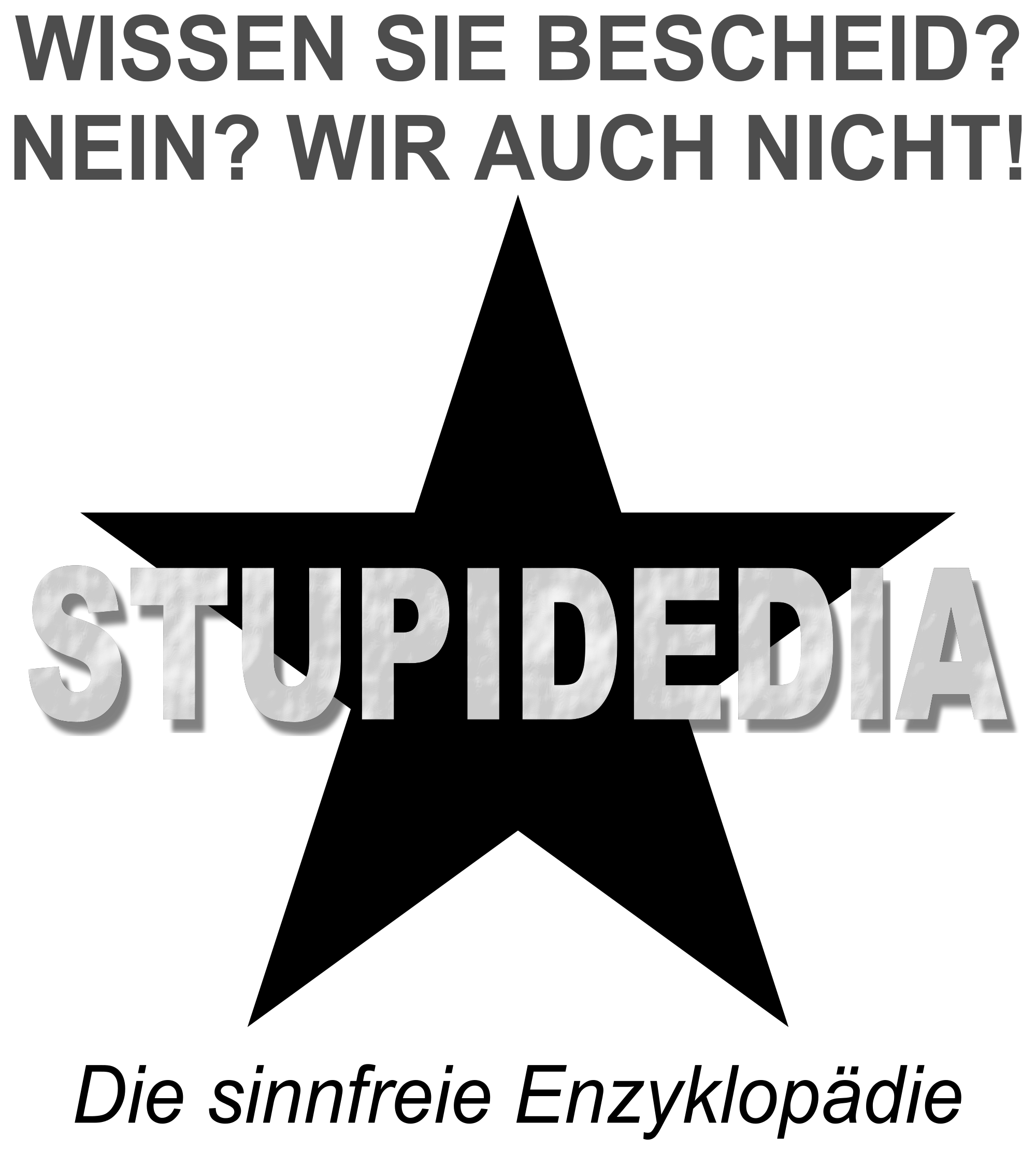
- Website type: Satirical wiki
- Owner: David Sowka
- Creator: David Sowka
- Revenue: Advertisements
- Website: www.stupidedia.org
- Registration: Optional
- Launched: 17 December 2004
- Current status: Active

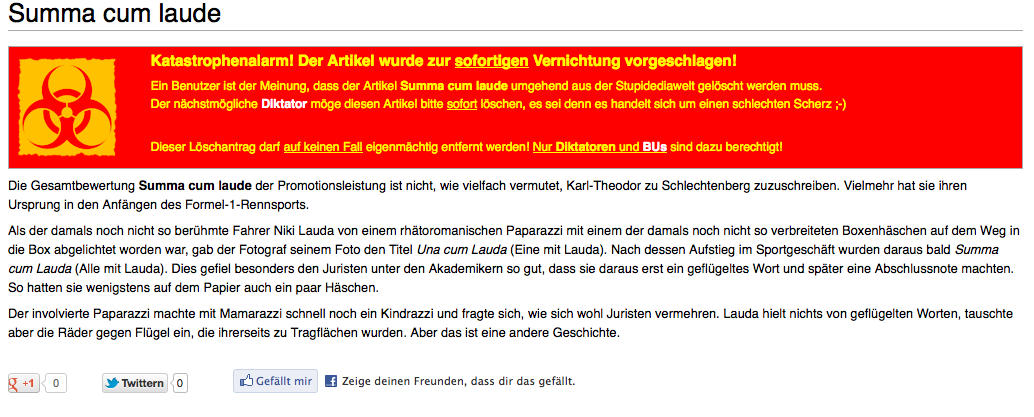
Article "Summa cum laude" [With Highest Praise] is tagged with the "Disaster Alert" template and put up for deletion.

Stupidedia (from Stupid and encyclopedia) is a German-language wiki featuring satirically themed and humorous articles. Stupidedia is the largest German-language wiki of this kind, with over 23,942 articles as of January 2018. It uses MediaWiki software, like many other wikis. Some articles of celebrities which are considered overly offensive, such as their article on Heino or Bushido, have been blocked. The site was launched in 2004, a year prior to its English counterpart, Uncyclopedia, which has since surpassed the website in popularity due to its closure to new users since 1 February 2018.

== Competitions and projects ==
=== Hammer articles ===
So-called hammer articles were introduced in 2006. They were suggested by users, then voted on and finally awarded with a hammer. Starting in August 2012 it was also possible to award articles as gelungene Artikel (English: well written article). Stupidedia's dictators were entitled to award some hammer articles as Goldpokalartikel (English literally: gold trophy article) via an internal vote amongst the websites dictators. Any article that was recognized as outstanding by the community and had been added to the hall of fame was then featured on the homepage.

=== Contests ===
The community regularly hosted various contests such as the Stupid Contest, the Stupid Art Contest, and the Stub des Monats (English literally: stub of the month).

== Miscellaneous ==
Stupidedia also attracted attention by parodying certain events from world affairs in a large project consisting of several articles. For example, the Iraq war was portrayed in the category named Spiegelwelten (English: Mirror worlds) as an “Oceania conflict”. The most comprehensive large-scale project of this kind was the parody of the 2008 European Football Championship, which was parodied in the Stupidedia as the 2008 The Football Championship of the Universe. This was organized and published - from fictional states and their teams - down to the smallest detail by the individual authors. A second edition under the title The Football Championship of the Universe 2010 took place in parallel to the 2010 FIFA World Cup and a third championship was held parallel to the 2012 European Championship.

Starting in 2014, there was a project named Stupidedia hilft! (English: Stupidedia helps!), where users can ask all kinds of questions and have experts from Stupidedia answer them in a satirical manner.

== See also ==
- Uncyclopedia
- Encyclopedia Dramatica
