= Lee Daniel Crocker =

American software programmer (born 1963)

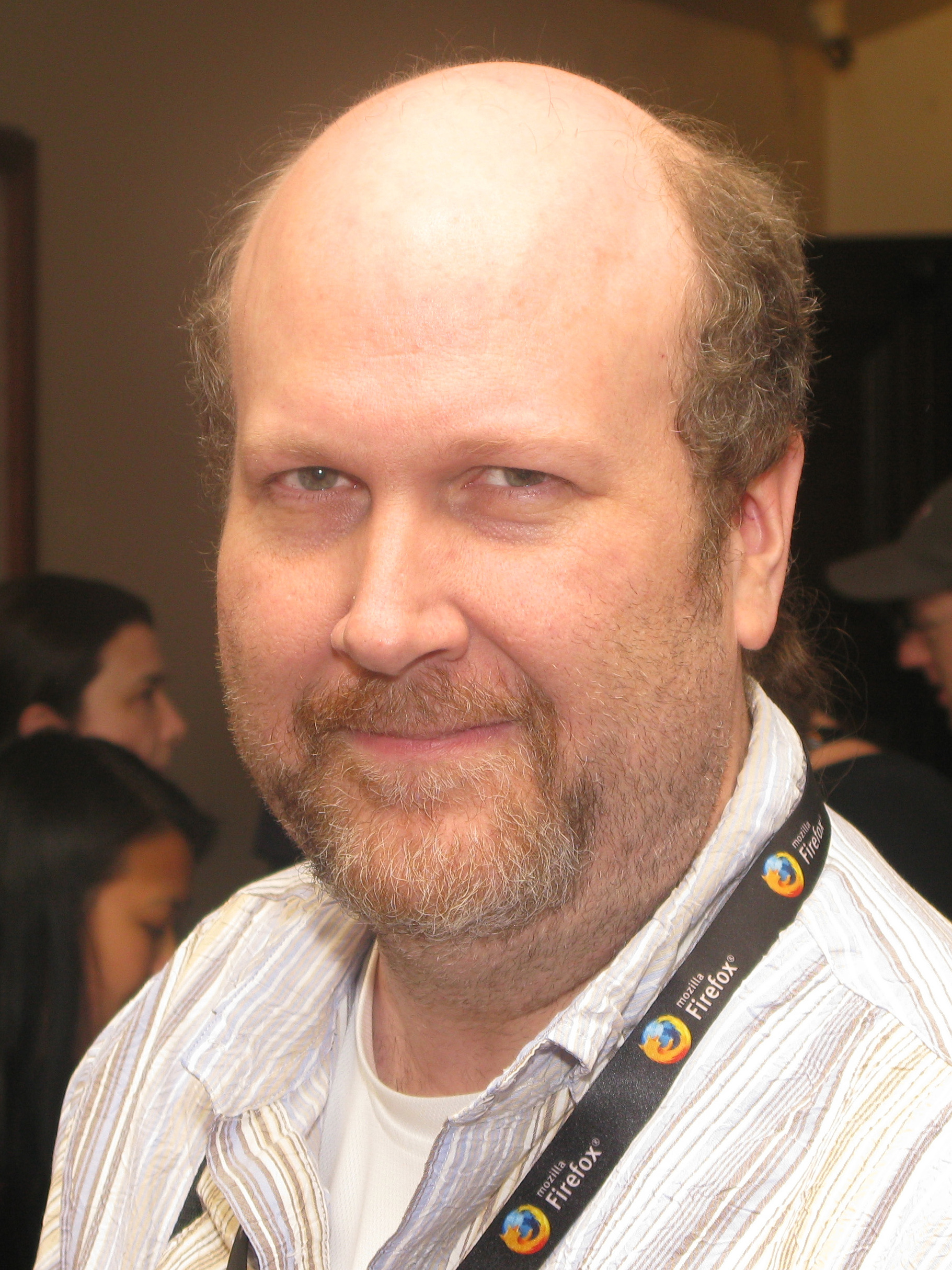
- Crocker in 2008
- Born: Lee Daniel Crocker; July 3, 1963 (age 63); Valdosta, Georgia, U.S.
- Occupations: Computer programmer; Wikipedian

Lee Daniel Crocker (born July 3, 1963) is an American computer programmer who rewrote MediaWiki.

He is a co-author of the PNG specification, and was also involved in the creation of the GIF and JPEG image file formats. He invented the per-scanline variable pre-filtering compression method used by PNG, the sum-of-abs heuristic used by many encoding programs. In 1998, he was one of the 23 original creators of the "Transhumanist Declaration". As of 1999, he was a member of the Extropians futurist society.

In June 2010, Crocker was among those recognized by the Software Tools Users Group (STUG) as a major contributor to MediaWiki when they awarded MediaWiki and the Wikimedia Foundation the USENIX Advanced Computing Technical Association STUG award for "the largest collaboratively edited reference projects in the world, including Wikipedia".

== See also ==
- List of Wikipedia people
