= Flagged Revisions =

Software extension to MediaWiki

FlaggedRevs
- Original authors: Aaron Schulz, Joerg Baach
- Developer: Wikimedia Foundation, Inc.
- Type: MediaWiki extension
- License: GPL-2.0-or-later
- Website: www.mediawiki.org/wiki/Extension:FlaggedRevs
- Repository: phabricator.wikimedia.org/diffusion/EFLR

Flagged Revisions, also known as FlaggedRevs, is a software extension to the MediaWiki software that allows moderation of edits to wiki pages. It was developed by the Wikimedia Foundation for use on Wikipedia and similar wikis hosted on its servers. The term is also sometimes used for the editorial policies related to operation of that extension when active.

== Detail ==
Flagged revisions was a planned editorial policy of English Wikipedia aimed at "imposing a layer of editorial review on articles about living people". Wikipedia's co-founder, Jimmy Wales, originally urged Wikipedia to adopt the policy in January 2009 after the Wikipedia pages of Robert Byrd and Edward Kennedy were both vandalized to state, incorrectly, that they were dead. It was announced in August 2009, after a poll found that 80% of the users were in favor of it. It provides for "experienced volunteer editors" to approve changes to some articles. It became active on the German Wikipedia, with all articles being subject to this policy. In the English Wikipedia, a two-month initial trial took place in 2010. It was considered a possibility that all articles would be covered by this feature in the future, just like in the German Wikipedia. The New York Times remarked that the new policy divides Wikipedia users in two classes: "experienced, trusted editors, and everyone else—altering Wikipedia's implicit notion that everyone has an equal right to edit entries". Brennon Slattery of PCWorld reported that "some bloggers" received the announced changes as a "failure" of the philosophy behind Wikipedia. According to the chairman of the Wikimedia Foundation board at the time, with this policy there is less tolerance for "inaccurate or fudged" articles. The feature is based on a plug-in for the MediaWiki software that prevents recent changes to wiki articles from being displayed to all readers until they have been ratified by editors with special permissions.

On June 14, 2010, English Wikipedia began a 2-month trial of its implementation of the feature known as pending changes. After a discussion among English Wikipedia editors in May 2011, this feature was initially removed from all articles, but consensus in a 2012 discussion decided that the feature would be implemented. By 2021, the feature was not widely used on biographies of living people and was unmaintained.
