= Link-richness =

Quality of having many hyperlinks

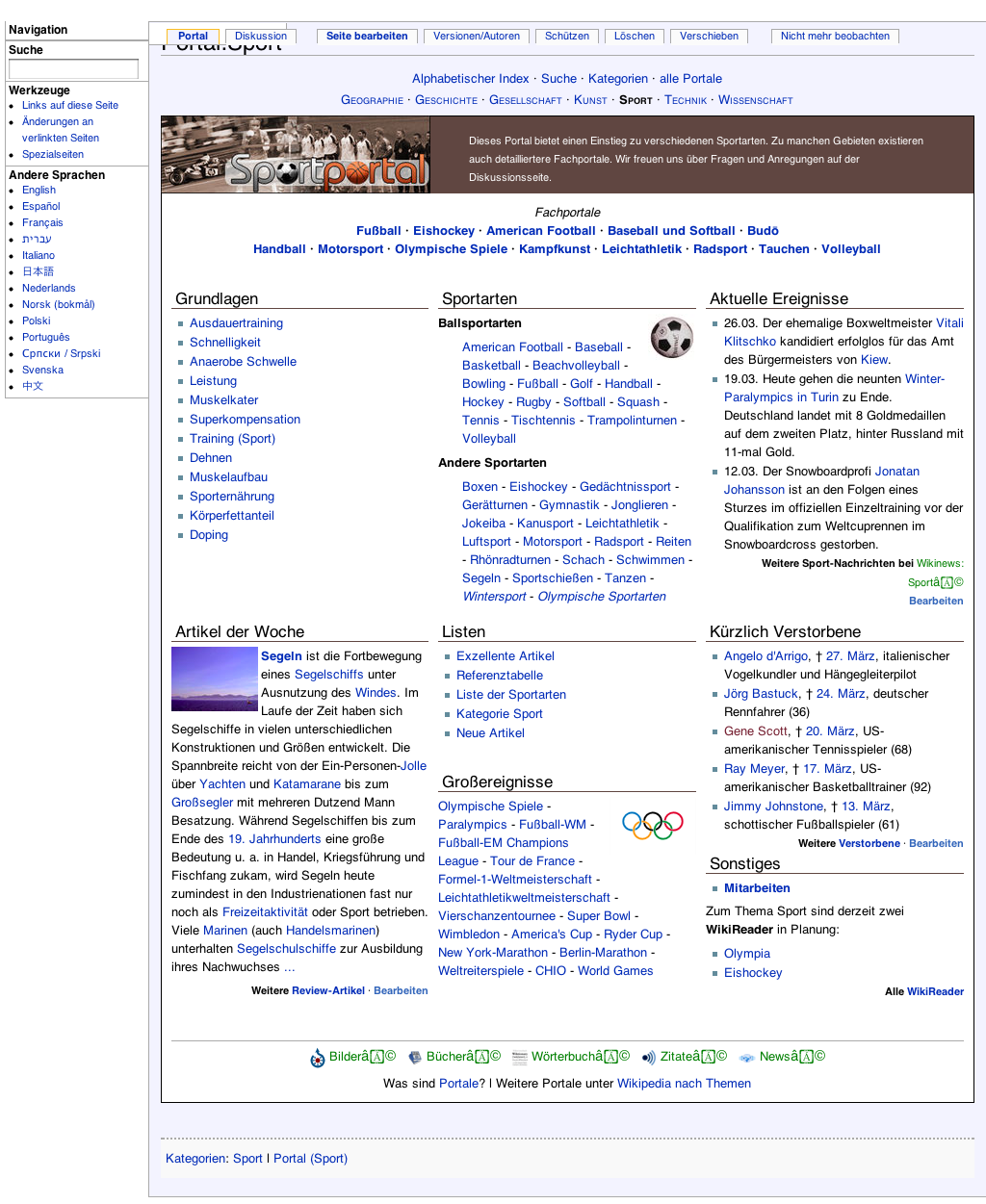
Wikipedia Portal pages are very link-rich.

Link-richness is the quality, possessed by some websites, of having many hyperlinks. Classified advertising sites like Craigslist tend to be very link-rich, sometimes with hundreds of links on their main page. They help users find the links they are looking for by grouping links into clusters. Inadequate link richness has been described as frustrating to readers, as it reduces transparency of site content from the main page. Students new to wiki collaboration were found to need guidance in how to take full advantage of the medium's potential for creating link-rich content.

Link-richness in some contexts can be distracting, as when an article is surrounded by extraneous links. Indeed, it is becoming accepted as a best practice for universities to have link-rich home pages that do not rely on user categorisation and exploration of long sequences of links and are not constrained by traditional boundaries between departments. Tools are sometimes needed to make the publishing of link-rich web sites tractable, and many people may lack the technical skills, time, or inclination to engage in hand- crafting new digital document forms.

A link-rich site that is low on content is sometimes referred to as a "gateway site." Link-rich portals were popular on the Web in 2000. Yahoo! and other sites featuring categories with many links were heavily used and often required fewer than three clicks to reach the content. Web designers were creating flat sites with content positioned close to the top of pages.
