= List of wikis =

A wiki is a form of hypertext publication on the internet which is collaboratively edited and managed by its audience directly through a web browser. As of 2026, the most popular wiki in the world is the English Wikipedia.

Other wikis include Fandom, which primarily hosts pop culture and media franchises; the Encyclopedia of Mathematics, a large reference encyclopedia in mathematics; government wikis such as Diplopedia and GCwiki; and other WikiMedia projects such as Wiktionary, Wikivoyage, and Wikiversity.

== Table ==
Name	Focus	Notes	Entries	License
AboutUs	Web directory	Initially pre-populated with information about many different websites. Uses MediaWiki software, but now largely with Ruby on Rails	28,739,286	GFDL and CC BY-SA 3.0
Appropedia	Poverty reduction, international development		15,437	CC BY-SA 4.0
Astro-Databank	Encyclopedic	Astrological wiki project, with birth details for notable people of the world.	37,614	
Baidu Baike	Encyclopedic / Simplified Chinese		27,482,961	
Baike.com	Encyclopedic / Simplified Chinese		15,180,000	
Ballotpedia	Encyclopedic	Information regarding United States elections	550,069	
Brilliant	Math/Science	Written at the reading and comprehension level of an advanced high school student. Wiki pages are reviewed before they are put up.		
Base de datos	Encyclopedic/Spanish	Spanish language encyclopedia, with own wiki software.	13,518	Copyrighted/Other
Catawiki	Catalogues	Originally in Dutch, with English version. Collectors specific for comics, coins, stamps, trading cards, board games, model cars, model trains, bank notes, books, watches, Disney memorabilia, clocks and other.	200,000	
Citizendium	Encyclopedic	Now defunct project by Larry Sanger	17,258	CC BY-SA 3.0
Conservapedia	Encyclopedic	Information and articles are written from a conservative Christian viewpoint aimed at correcting the alleged liberal bias of Wikipedia.	56,257	Copyrighted (free use)
Copyright Evidence	Copyright studies	Exists to inform public debate and policy development on copyright related issues based on categorising empirical studies. Funded and maintained by CREATe at the University of Glasgow.	2,980	
Choral Public Domain Library (CPDL)	Music	Wiki library of free typeset musical scores	40,888	Public domain, CPDL License, CC licenses, Copyrighted (free use)
DavisWiki	Place – Davis, California	City wiki dedicated solely to Davis; at one point the largest city wiki	15,593	CC BY 3.0
Diplopedia	Government – Diplomacy	Encyclopedia of the U.S. Department of State collecting items related to international relations and diplomacy		
EcuRed	Cuban perspective on global issues, in Spanish	Run by Cuba's Youth Computer Club, an affiliate of the Communist Youth Union	19,482	CC BY-NC-SA.
Enciclopedia Libre Universal en Español	Encyclopedic/Spanish	Now defunct Spanish language fork of Wikipedia	47,281	CC BY-SA 3.0
Encyclopedia of Mathematics	Mathematics	MediaWiki using MathJax extension	16,211	CC BY-SA 3.0
Encyclopedia Dramatica	Parody of Internet memes	Parody-themed wiki	14,972	Fair use
Everipedia	Encyclopedic		6,000,000	CC BY-SA 4.0
Fallout Wiki	Fiction/Gaming – Fallout series	Wiki about the Fallout video game series. Ongoing merger with "Nukapedia" (Fandom) and "The Vault" (Curse/Gamepedia).	58,000	CC BY-SA
Family History Research Wiki	Genealogy research	Reference information and research guidance. In 11 languages.	82,857	CC BY-SA 3.0 US
Fandom	Pop culture and media franchises	Wiki hosting service. It is a collection of many wikis, each focusing on a different subject.	more than 40,000,000 articles	CC BY-SA 3.0
Fanlore	Fandom	Fandom and transformative works, with a focus on fannish history and activities. Powered by MediaWiki.	60,753	CC BY-NC 3.0 US
Foodista.com	Reference – Food and Cooking	Creative Commons structured wiki about foods, recipes, and other culinary information.		CC BY
La Frikipedia	Parody of encyclopedia	Spanish language parody of Wikipedia.	11,159	GFDL
Fringepedia	Fiction – Fringe, related 'fringe science' topics	Powered by MediaWiki.	6,759	CC BY-NC-SA
Gardenology.org	Gardening	Meant as a "complete plant and garden wiki encyclopedia"	22,005	CC BY-SA
GCpedia	Government — Canada	Internal Government of Canada Wiki		
GeoNames	Places	Geographical database that links specific names with unique features		
GitLab wikis		Mainly computer software program documentation		
Glottopedia	Linguistics – Multilingual	A Wiki on linguistics and languages	3,227	
Heroes Wiki	Fiction – Heroes	Articles about the TV show Heroes.		
Hitchwiki	Encyclopedic – Multilingual	A database on hitchhiking that includes an interactive world map showing the best and worst places to catch a ride.	3,867 in English and about 2,000 more in 16 different languages.	
ICANNWiki	Internet Governance	Covers all aspects of ICANN and its policymaking, as well as Internet Governance in general.	8,700	
ICE List				
Intellipedia	Government – Intelligence	Three non-accessible wikis running on networks that link the U.S. intelligence community		
International Music Score Library Project	Music	Wiki library of public domain musical scores	14,800	GFDL
Internet Movie Firearms Database (IMFDb)	Firearm usage in Film, Television and Videogames	Runs on MediaWiki	27,723	
JurisPedia	Government – Law	Multi-lingual academic encyclopedia, including Arabic, Chinese (Simplified Chinese), English, French, German and Spanish		CC BY-NC
Know Your Meme	Fiction – website and video series		28,105	
LifeWiki	Conway's Game of Life			GFDL 1.2
Lost Media Wiki	Lost media			
Lostpedia	Fiction – Lost	Articles about episodes, characters, themes, etc. in the television show.	7,457	CC BY-NC-ND
LyricWiki	Music – Lyrics	Listing of lyrics by album	1,737,000	Mostly copyrighted. CC BY-SA for minority of content.
MeatballWiki	Communities – Online communities		5,213	Copyrighted
Memory Alpha	Fiction – Star Trek	Contains canon-only material	62,397	CC BY-NC 4.0
Metapedia	Encyclopedia	White nationalist and extreme right-wing online encyclopedia.	7,896	Unknown
MicroWiki	Micronationalism	Runs on MediaWiki.	39,703	CC BY-SA 4.0
Monoskop	Arts and humanities	"Wiki for arts and studies" powered by MediaWiki		
MyWikiBiz	Misc – Business directory	Allows people and enterprises to write about themselves	9,093	GFDL and other
Namuwiki	Encyclopedic/Korean		602,837	CC BY-NC-SA 2.0 KR
nLab	Mathematics, physics, and philosophy wiki	For research-level notes, expositions and collaborative work, including original research, especially from the n-categorical point of view.	18,098	No formal license. Freely reusable if source acknowledged.
OpenStreetMap	Places – Maps	Uses GPS, aerial photography and other free sources of images to create a map of the world		ODbL 1.0
OpenWetWare	Science – Biology	Promotes sharing and dissemination of knowledge related to biological research		CC BY-SA
PCGamingWiki	Games – PC games	Aims to provide fixes and information on all PC games	45,508	CC NC-SA 3.0
PlanetMath	Misc – Mathematics	Free wiki-style mathematical encyclopedia		
Proteopedia	Science – Chemistry	A 3D encyclopedia of proteins and other molecules	191,915	Copyrighted
RationalWiki	Encyclopedic	Information and articles are written from a liberal, skeptical and secular point of view originally as a response to Conservapedia	8,044	CC BY-SA 3.0
Rangjung Yeshe Wiki	Himalayan Buddhism, Tibetan Dictionary	Tibetan-English Dictionary, Buddhist Glossaries, Biographies of Buddhist Teachers, and Resources	23,721	CC BY-NC-SA / GFDL
Rosetta Code	Computers — source code	Powered by MediaWiki	2,045	GFDL 1.2
Ruwiki	Encyclopedic	Wikipedia fork created to follow government narratives in 2023	1,913,845	CC BY-SA 4.0
Scholarpedia	Encyclopedic	Written exclusively by professionals focusing on their field of expertise; subject to peer review	1,812	Copyrighted
SCP Foundation	Fiction — horror, science fiction, urban fantasy	Fictional secret organization documented by the collaborative writing wiki project of the same name	15,000	CC BY-SA 3.0
Sensei's Library	Misc – Go (game)	WikiWiki Web site running on GoWiki, a custom wiki based on PhpWiki.	18,200	OPL
SKYbrary	Aviation safety information	Runs on MediaWiki.		
SNPedia	Science – Biology	Database of research and information about single-nucleotide polymorphisms, including medical consequences for people who have DNA info about themselves	195,101	CC BY-NC-SA 3.0
Sogou Baike	Encyclopedic / Simplified Chinese		900,000	
Stadtwiki Karlsruhe	Encyclopedic	Multilingual city wiki for Karlsruhe	21,157	CC BY-NC-SA
Supernatural Wiki	Fiction – Supernatural	The wiki for the hit TV show Supernatural	4,224	
TermWiki	Words in different languages	Social learning network built around terms and questions in 75 languages.	1,417,806	
Tolkien Gateway	Fiction – J.R.R. Tolkien	Encyclopedia dedicated to J.R.R. Tolkien's legendarium.	13,600	CC BY-SA 4.0
Travellerspoint	Places – Travel	Social networking site dedicated to sharing stories and recommendations about travel	8,578	CC BY-SA 3.0
TV Tropes	Encyclopedic	Focuses on documenting tropes in various media	551,245	CC BY-NC-SA
UK LGBT History Project	LGBT history, United Kingdom	Building towards a comprehensive history of LGBT (Lesbian, Gay, Bisexual, Transgender) life in the United Kingdom. Known for a time as the UK LGBT Archive. Runs on MediaWiki.	4,682	CC BY-SA 3.0
The Unofficial Elder Scrolls Pages	Fan wiki	Encyclopedia dedicated to The Elder Scrolls	120,000	
Uncyclopedia	Satire – Parody	Satirical encyclopedia dedicated to parody, notably parodying Wikipedia. Has 2 "official" English versions due to a split.	37,749	CC BY-NC-SA 2.0
Veropedia	Selected English Wikipedia articles	A free, advertising-supported Internet encyclopedia project		
Vienna History Wiki	History of the city of Vienna, Austria.	The main content of the wiki are persons, buildings, topographical objects (streets, parks, waters, districts...), organisations, events and other items (such as special German expressions used in Vienna)	185,636	CC BY-NC-ND
WikiAnswers	General knowledge	Compiles answers to questions posed	11,265,000	Copyrighted
WikiArt	Art, paintings	Project aims to create high-quality, complete and well-structured online repository of fine art.	75,000	Public domain artworks
Wikibooks	General – textbooks	Wikimedia project	378,467	CC BY-SA/other
Wikidata		Wikimedia project	124,065,176 items	CC0 1.0, CC BY-SA 4.0
WikiEducator	Open educational resources	Open educational resources which anyone may use, adapt, and share	25,652	CC BY-SA and CC BY
WikEM	Emergency Medicine	Rapid reference for practical point-of-care clinical knowledge with a popular linked point-of-care phone application. Intended for clinicians only and not directly for patients.	4,704	CC BY-NC-ND 4.0
Wikenigma	Unsolved problems		>1100	CC BY-NC 4.0
wikiHow	How-to articles	A wiki how-to manual	166,386	CC BY-NC-SA 3.0
WikiIslam	Criticism of Islam		977	CC BY-NC 3.0
Wikimapia	Places – Map	Combines Google Maps with a wiki system for polygonally defined areas; currently supports 35 languages	13,300,000	CC BY-NC-SA
Wikimedia Commons	Misc – Electronic media	Repository of free electronic media; a Wikimedia project	150,415,485 files	CC BY-SA and some other free licenses
Wikinews	General – News	Collaborative news service, a Wikimedia project	−1 articles	CC BY
Wikipedia	Encyclopedic	Multilingual Wikimedia project that uses MediaWiki	68,779,070 articles	CC BY-SA 3.0 for text (July 15, 2009–now). Files have various licenses. Dual license under GFDL and CC BY-SA 3.0 for text (November 1, 2008 – July 15, 2009). GFDL for text (–November 1, 2008).
Wikiquote	Reference – Quotations	Quote repository; a Wikimedia project	391,012 articles	CC BY-SA
WikiShia	Shi'a Islam	Online encyclopedia focusing on Shi'a, the second major denomination in Islam. It has articles in 8 languages. Persian has the most articles which is more than 3500.	4,443 in English	Unknown
Wikisource	Reference – Primary sources	Digital library of free content textual sources; a Wikimedia project	12,000,441 articles	CC BY-SA
Wikispecies	Science – Biology	Directory of species; a Wikimedia project	968,217 articles	GFDL and CC BY-SA
Wikitravel	Places – Travel	Travel guide using Wikimedia's software, but unconnected to the Wikimedia Foundation (which hosts Wikivoyage). 20 supported languages	62,345	CC BY-SA 3.0
WikiTree	Genealogy	Free global family tree using MediaWiki software, but unconnected to the Wikimedia Foundation.	11,148,296	Unknown
Wikiversity	General – Self-directed learning	Supports free learning communities, projects, materials, and learners; a Wikimedia project		CC BY-SA 3.0
Wikivoyage	Places – Travel	Multilingual travel guide of the Wikimedia Foundation.	149,300 articles	CC BY-SA 3.0
WikiWikiWeb	Computer programming, specifically design patterns	World's oldest wiki (began circa 1995)	34,997	GPL
Wiktionary	Multilingual dictionary	Online dictionary; a Wikimedia project	52,592,961 articles	CC BY-SA 3.0
Wookieepedia	Fiction – Star Wars	Science fiction encyclopedia	210,338	CC BY-SA 3.0
Wowpedia / WoWWiki	Gaming – Warcraft	Contains in-universe material	168,466 (Wowpedia); 105,351 (WoWWiki)	CC BY-SA 3.0

== See also ==
- List of online encyclopedias
- List of multilingual MediaWiki sites
- List of content forks of Wikipedia
