= Steinbrecher =

Steinbrecher (from German: Stein "stone" plus Brecher "breaker") is a German language occupational surname for a person who worked in a stone quarry. Notable people with the name include:

- Alexander Steinbrecher (1910–1982), Austrian composer
- Edwin Charles Steinbrecher (1930–2002), American astrologer
- Hank Steinbrecher (1947–2025), American soccer executive, player, and coach
- Helmut Steinbrecher (1896–unknown), German World War I pilot
- Jon Steinbrecher, American sports official
- Marianne Steinbrecher (born 1983), Brazilian volleyball player
- Michael Steinbrecher (born 1965), German television presenter and journalist
