= WikiCandidate =

- Website type: wiki
- Available in: English
- Creators: Cornell University students and faculty
- Website: WikiCandidate08.com
- Registration: required (to edit)

WikiCandidate was a wiki designed to collaboratively create a virtual political campaign for a fictional U.S. presidential candidate. Begun by students and faculty at the Cornell University Department of Communication, its content was intended to be a tool for understanding what characteristics the ideal candidate would have, as determined through a consensus among the community of users. For the university, the endeavor was a research project investigating online civic participation. The site was run on MediaWiki and registering an account was required to edit. All content on the site was published under a Creative Commons Attribution-Noncommercial-Share Alike 3.0 Unported license.

== See also ==
- List of wikis
