= George Broadhead =

British gay activist (1933–2021)

- Born: 1933; Douglas, Isle of Man
- Died: 2021 (aged 87–88); Kenilworth, Warwickshire
- Education: Keele University
- Organisation(s): LGBT Humanists UK (co-founder); Pink Triangle Trust
- Movement: Humanism, LGBT rights
- Partner: Roy Saich

George Broadhead (1933–2021) was a humanist activist and gay rights campaigner. He was co-founder, in 1979, of the Gay Humanist Group (today known as LGBT Humanists) and later of the Pink Triangle Trust, two of the longest established gay and lesbian groups in the UK.

== Personal life ==
George Alfred Broadhead was born in 1933 in Douglas, Isle of Man, where his parents were proprietors of a bed and breakfast hotel. He attended Douglas High School for Boys and went on to study English and French at Keele University. He lived for much of his life in Kenilworth, Warwickshire, with his partner of 57 years Roy Saich.

== Activism ==
Among the earliest members of the Campaign for Homosexual Equality (CHE), in 1979 Broadhead was a founding member of the Gay Humanist Group (which later became the Gay and Lesbian Humanist Association, and is today known as LGBT Humanists). The group was launched at CHE's annual conference that year. Its aims, as Barry Duke has written, were:

to make gay people aware of the gay-friendly Humanist ethical outlook; to further an awareness among heterosexual Humanists of the widespread prejudice and discrimination suffered by gays whilst encouraging their support; and to play a part in the campaign for gay and Humanist rights.

Broadhead served as Secretary of the Gay Humanist Group for 25 years, and was described by fellow activist and writer Jim Herrick as 'a tower of strength'. Terry Sanderson wrote that he provided 'a steady voice against the encroachment and growth of religious homophobia'. Broadhead led on administration, promotion, and communication with members and other LGBT groups, and acted as editor of The Gay Humanist, the magazine of the Gay Humanist Group. In 1984, four years after the formation of the Gay Humanist Group, Broadhead wrote to Canadian magazine The Body Politic to offer his help to any Canadians wishing to start a similar group. He was also active in the Coventry Humanist Group, including as their Press Officer. In 1992, Broadhead co-founded the Pink Triangle Trust, an educational charity formed for:

1. the advancement of the education of the public, and particularly of lesbians and gay men, in the principles and practice of humanism;

2. the advancement of the education of the public, about all aspects of homosexuality;

3. the assistance of particular poor persons to obtain remedies under the law where they have suffered unlawful discrimination or injustice on account of either.

The Pink Triangle Trust also offered humanist affirmation ceremonies for same sex couples. The Trust was a significant contributor to a secular school in Uganda, which today has a classroom named for Broadhead and Saich.

George Broadhead died in Kenilworth in 2021, aged 87.
