= Shunee Yee =

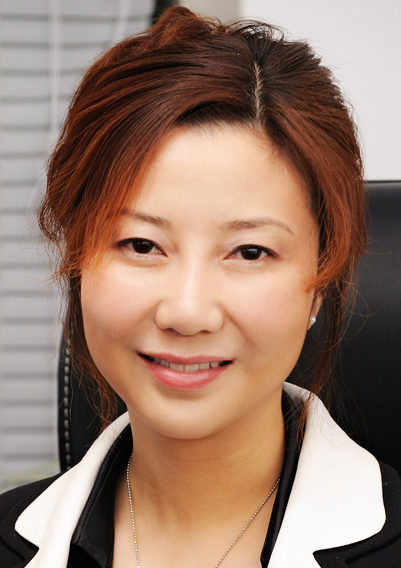
- Shunee Yee in 2012.
- Occupations: CEO and president, CSOFT International

Shunee Yee Ms. Shunee Yee is the president and CEO of CSOFT International and CSOFT Health Sciences. Responsible for its organic growth from a start-up in a two-bedroom apartment, to becoming an industry leader, Yee oversees CSOFT’s operations across 3 continents.

Ms. Yee sits on Dexter Southfield School’s academic board, and she is a committee member of A Taste of Ginger, an event hosted by the world-renowned Joslin Center, for promoting awareness and education in support of the Asian American Diabetes Initiative.

== Early life and education ==
Born in Nanjing, Yee holds a BA from Nanjing Normal University, an MA from Rhode Island College, and has completed a senior executive program at Harvard Business School in Massachusetts.

== Career ==
=== CSOFT International ===
In 2003, Yee founded CSOFT International. She has grown CSOFT into a global business with a network of over 10,000 translators worldwide. With headquarters in Beijing and Boston, CSOFT has been recognized as one of EContent's Top 100 Companies in the Digital Content Industry in 2017 and a Top Innovative Company in 2011 by IDC.

CSOFT holds patented AI technology that supports the world's first mobile translation platform powered by human translators and interpreters from around the world.

=== Let Girls Learn ===
In February 2016, Yee began a collaboration with the White House to translate materials for the Let Girls Learn campaign. CSOFT led the first round of translation for these manuals.

== Awards and achievements ==
In 2009, the Stevie Awards selected her as the Best Asian Entrepreneur for Women in Business, and two years later, she was recognized as a Top 25 Globalization Executive by Globalization Today. In 2012, CNN called her one of the “technology industry’s 36 most powerful disrupters,” and Yee was later named a Fortune Top Ten Most Powerful Women Entrepreneur. And in 2015, The Economist listed her among the Top 50 Global Diversity Professionals in an industry. She has been featured in several publications, including Forbes, The Wall Street Journal, USA Today, CNN, Fortune, China Daily, CNBC, Biz Women and more.

In January 2014, Yee was given the honorary title of guest professor at Guangdong University of Foreign Studies, collaborating to improve translation quality across China. Using her expertise, Yee utilized the university's language technologies, expertise in terminology management, developed in-depth strategies on foreign language research, and worked with language experts to help the leading university foster more high-level personnel.

In June 2014, CSOFT partnered with the Shenzhen Municipal Government to create a China-wide, four week ‘Global Etiquette’ public service campaign. The company was responsible for Shenzhen's overseas promotion and propaganda. In her role as campaign collaborator and globalization expert, Shunee Yee was invited to give a speech at Shenzhen Library's City Hall during Shenzhen International Etiquette Awareness Month. There, she spoke to over 350 business leaders, government officials, and Shenzhen citizens on the importance of etiquette in the business community.

In November 2015, Shunee Yee was selected as an advisor on business promotion by the Futian Economic Promotion Bureau of Shenzhen. For the duration of the 2-year partnership, Yee will act as a consultant to support leaders in investment consulting, with focus on international investment services.

== Additional accomplishments ==
2014

- Yee invited to White House to discuss women in business with U.S. Small Business Administrator, U.S. Chief Technology Officer and other senior officials.
- CSOFT launches “East to West” consulting services to provide branding expertise to China-based clients.

2015

- Localization industry analyst organization Common Sense Advisory ranks CSOFT fourth on their list of Top Language Service Providers in Asia (Localization is a US$38 billion industry)
- Yee invited to and join the Obama Administrations Let Girls Learn campaign, an initiative which aspires to foster leadership qualities among young girls.

2017

- Interviewed with Bloomberg Television on Bloomberg Markets Asia about the tech growth in China and how CSOFT translates products, brands, and operations across all markets.

2019

- Yee founded CSOFT Health Sciences

== See also ==
- Fortune Most Powerful Women Entrepreneurs
- TermWiki (created by CSOFT International Ltd.)
