= TermWiki =

Social learning network

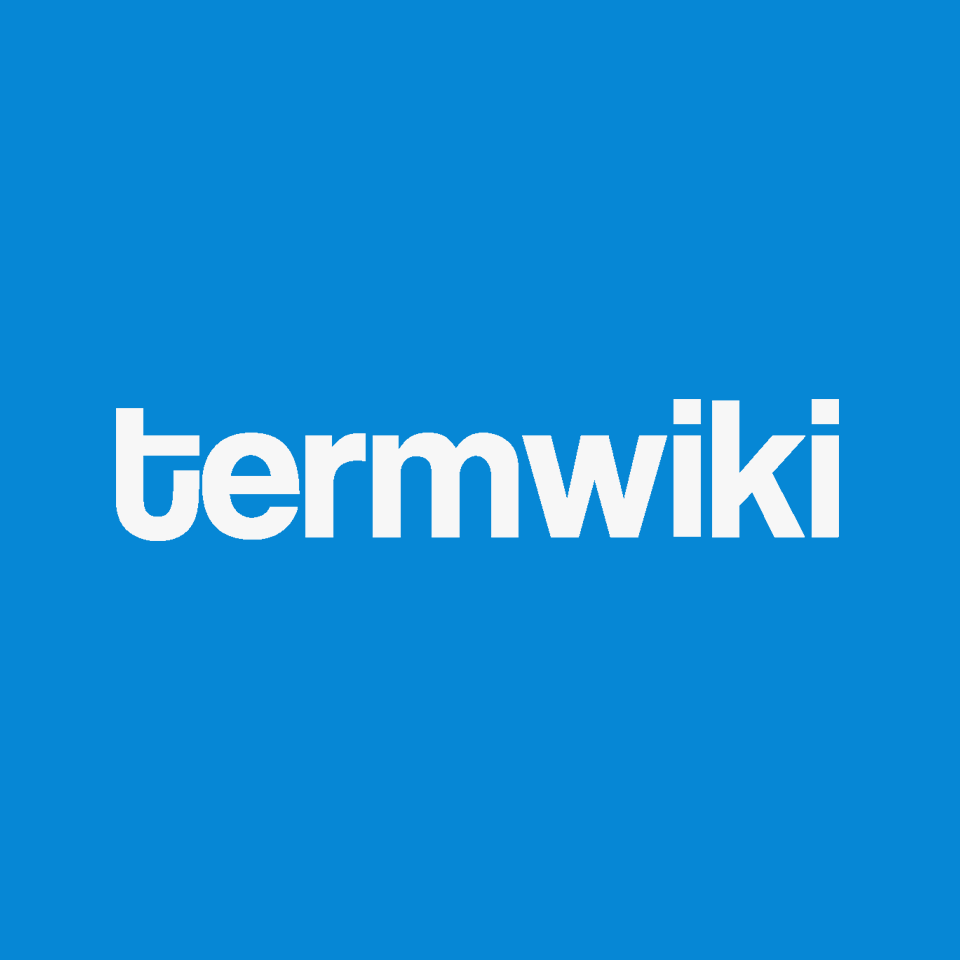
- Available in: 100+ Languages
- Headquarters: China
- Owner: CSOFT International
- Website: http://www.termwiki.com
- Registration: Optional

TermWiki.com (pronounced /ˈtɜːrmˌwɪki/) is a major social learning network that allows users to learn, discover, share, and store personal terms and glossaries in 1487 domains in 97 languages. The site emphasizes collaboration, with a forum, a question/answer module, messaging features that encourage user interaction, and discussion pages on each term. The personal profile page allows users to become fans of other users, add photos, and add links and post comments on other users recent activity. TermWiki also allows companies to conduct international ad campaigns on keyword terms, for improved SEO performance.

The platform was developed by the localization and software development company CSOFT International. Released in May 2010, the tool has both an open and free community version, and private, professional versions for internal usage within organizations.

The name "TermWiki" is a combination of the words term (short for terminology) and wiki (from the first wiki, WikiWikiWeb, wiki being the Hawaiian word for quick).

== Development ==
Development of TermWiki began in 2009, using MediaWiki software as a development platform. The tool was formally released in May 2010 and has added several functions since then including translator and reviewer workbenches, pages on featured terms, and the ‘My Glossary’ module for managing glossaries online. TermWiki was created by Carl Yao, who also founded the translation service Stepes.

== Basic Functions ==
- “Add term” forms with pick lists, to ensure consistent data
- Customizable search filters
- Structured data, categorized by industry/domain, products, companies, etc.
- Revision history tracking
- Automatic change notifications
- MT-powered batch entry modules
- Glossary import/export
- Multimedia support (images, sound bites, videos, etc.)

== Modules ==
- My Glossary – Allows individuals to use the site to manage their own glossaries, including adding, importing and translating terms. Friends can be invited to view, rate or translate terms.
- Forum – For the general discussion of terminology, translation, and other topics.
- AnswerBea – Community-driven question and answer portal.
- TermBea – Subject-specific crossword game, automatically generated from the content in TermWiki.
- TermWiki Toolbar – Internet Explorer or Firefox toolbar for access to TermWiki's most popular features, and for term reference. A related module is Terms in the news, a list of current and popular terms that are being featured in popular global news stories.

As of November 24, 2011, there have been 1,782,245 pages created.

== Versions ==
The software has three versions, Community (which is publicly editable), Professional and Enterprise. The Professional version, called TermWiki Pro, is a cloud-based tool that facilitates the collaborative creation, translation, and management of multilingual terminology. This latest edition of TermWiki offers an expansion of the application's functionality to freelance translators, content professionals and language service providers that require a secure platform in which to host and maintain their multilingual glossaries. The other version, Enterprise, is also a secure, online terminology management platform, but offers more opportunities for customization. It also gives additional support to terminology project managers through a task-management feature.

TermWiki will soon be releasing an Android TermWiki app allowing users to look up terms in 1500 categories in 85 languages. It will also contain a pronunciation and image feature.

== Localization ==
The user interface of TermWiki.com has been translated into eight language editions, including English, French, German, Japanese, Chinese, Spanish and Italian. In addition, the site has terms in approximately 97 languages.

== Blossary ==
In 2014, CSOFT launched Blossary.com, based on the TermWiki software.

== See also ==
- List of wikis
- Shunee Yee, President & CEO of CSOFT
