= WikiShia =

Online encyclopedia about Shia Islam

- Website type: Wiki
- Available in: English, Persian, French, Spanish, Arabic, Indonesian, Turkish, Urdu, German, Russian, Chinese, Hindi, Swahili, Bengali, Tajik, Azerbaijani, Portuguese, Italian, Hausa, Pashto, Thai, Burmese
- Owner: Ahl Al-Bayt World Assembly
- Website: http://wikishia.net
- Registration: None
- Users: over 350
- Launched: June 22, 2014; 12 years ago
- Written in: PHP

WikiShia is an online encyclopedia about Shia Islam. It contains more than 23,000 content pages about Shia Islam in 22 languages including English, Persian, Spanish, Turkish, French, Arabic, Urdu, Indonesian, German, Russian, Chinese, Hindi, Kiswahili, Bengali, Tajik, Portuguese, Azerbaijani, Italian, Hausa, Pashto, Thai, and Burmese. WikiShia is affiliated with Ahl Al-Bayt World Assembly, and was officially launched on June 22, 2014 in the International Congress of Sibt al-Nabi (a) in Tehran, by Hassan Rouhani, the president of the Islamic Republic of Iran.

The term "Shi'a" means "follower", "faction" or "party" of the Islamic prophet Muhammad's son-in-law and cousin 'Ali b. Abi Talib, whom the Shia believe to be Muhammad's successor in religious leadership and the Caliphate. WikiShia provides the visitors and readers with information about Shia's twelve Imams and their families as well as the political, social and cultural aspects of their lives. The aim, as is mentioned in the About Page, is to explain all concepts and issues related to knowing Twelver Shia (Imamiya) (including issues in history, geography, fiqh, principles of fiqh, concepts, beliefs, names, etc.). WikiShia is managed by a group of scholars in Qom, Iran.

== History ==
On May 22, 2013, the first session for collaboration of the authors of WikiShia was held. After some session of education, on June 17, the first entry of WikiShia was published on the web. In July 2013, the option for browsing the website without a username was made available to all Internet users. On June 22, 2014, in the International Congress of Sibt al-Nabi (a) in Tehran, WikiShia was officially launched by Hassan Rouhani, the president of the Islamic Republic of Iran.

== Content ==
The content of WikiShia includes beliefs, personalities, books, places, events, ceremonies and rituals of the sects believing in the household of Muhammad, the Prophet of Islam. History of Shia and any other issue which would be related to Shi'a in some ways are included in WikiShia. General Islamic concepts that are believed by all Muslims or related to Islamic history are also among the topics in this wiki. There are also some articles about other Islamic sects.

By the end of January 2022, the number of entries in Wikishia in all languages reached 24390, and it is growing day by day. As of January 2022, it has more than 4080 entries in English. Many scholars in Qom supervise the content of WikiShia. Currently, WikiShia is not an open wiki, so editing it is possible only with the managers' permission. It has about 100 active users all of which are verified by Ahl Al-Bayt World Assembly, but it has been said in "About page" of WikiShia that it'll be changed to an open wiki so everyone could signup and contribute.

Neutrality policy in the concepts of Shia and the Ahlul Bayt is to be observed in WikiShia. Still, this wiki's contributors consider themselves to be preaching the school of Shi'a, so the entries are written to explain and defend their teachings. However, the judgment about scholarly and historical disagreements is left to the reader. Due to religious disagreements, contributors of WikiShia are asked to try their best to benefit from first-hand sources accepted by the two great Islamic schools (Shia and Sunni).

== See also ==
- List of wikis
- Wiki
