= LGBT Humanists UK =

UK based humanist activists

LGBT Humanists
- Formation: 1979
- Founded at: Brighton, England
- Headquarters: London, England
- Region served: United Kingdom; Channel Islands; Isle of Man
- Coordinator: Nick Baldwin
- Key people: Maureen Duffy (past President); Andrew Copson (past chair)
- Parent organisation: Humanists UK
- Formerly called: Gay Humanist Group (1979–1987); Gay and Lesbian Humanist Association (1987–2012); Galha LGBT Humanists (2012–2015)

LGBT+ Humanists UK, founded in 1979, is a special interest section of Humanists UK which campaigns for lesbian, gay, bisexual and transgender (LGBT) equality and human rights in the United Kingdom. It also organises social events for LGBT+ humanists and public awareness initiatives around Humanism.

It was founded as a separate humanist organisation, the Gay Humanist Group, later the Gay and Lesbian Humanist Association (GALHA). It became a part of the British Humanist Association in 2012, and took on the name Galha LGBT Humanists before becoming LGBT Humanists UK in 2015. The British Humanist Association (BHA) became Humanists UK in 2017. Today, it is known as LGBT+ Humanists.

For many years, its President was the poet Maureen Duffy, who became a Patron of the BHA when the organisations merged. As GALHA, the group was independently affiliated with the International Humanist and Ethical Union (IHEU) and the NGO Amnesty International. The group is led by volunteers. Past chairs include Andrew Copson, the chief executive of the BHA, who is also President of IHEU.

== History and campaigns ==
=== Origins ===
The Gay Humanist Group was originally founded in response to the Gay News 'blasphemy' trial by members of the Campaign for Homosexual Equality at their Brighton conference in August 1979. The group had been responded in response to unfounded accusations by Mary Whitehouse that a "gay humanist lobby" was influencing public opinion and public policy. The founding members of the Gay Humanist Group thought that, while Whitehouse's claims were unfounded and untrue, that a gay humanist lobby group was a good idea and indeed one urgently needed. The Gay Humanist Group became GALHA (Gay and Lesbian Humanist Association) in 1987. It later became Galha LGBT Humanists in 2012, and then LGBT Humanists in 2015.

In 1983, LGBT Humanists lobbied Amnesty International to begin providing support for gays and lesbians in countries where people were persecuted for their sexuality. That same year, it innovated a 'Postal Action Group' that enabled its own members to lobby their MPs, ministers, and companies on 'gay and humanist rights' issues, akin to 21st century mass email lobbying tools. In 1989, Anthony Grey from the Homosexual Law Reform Society congratulated LGBT Humanists on its 10th anniversary, saying "Constantly having to combat irrational and dangerous thinking is strenuous and sometimes tedious, but not necessarily boring. It can be fun. And as no-one else is doing it as consistently and effectively as is necessary. I hope that GHG will concentrate on a demolition job of much of the silly rubbish that is still spouted about homosexuality."

Having been founded in response to a blasphemy trial, free speech also remained a perennial focus for the group, which extended "unequivocal" support to Humanists UK patron Salman Rushdie during the Rushdie affair in which he received a death sentence from Islamic fundamentalists in 1989. LGBT Humanists was at the forefront of the humanist movement's campaign against Section 28 (which prevented public authorities from acknowledging the existence of homosexuality, with numerous side effects such as schools not tackling homophobic bullying).

=== Marriage equality ===
From its inception, the Gay Humanist Group worked to combat widespread prejudice and religious bigotry towards LGBT people in the UK, at a time when attitudes to homosexuality were still fairly negative on the whole. Since that time the organisation has played key roles in UK-wide campaigns for LGBT equality, particularly marriage rights for LGBT couples. The group had provided non-recognised humanist marriage ceremonies for same-sex couples since the 1980s, and coordinated a number of such ceremonies outside Parliament to inspire legislative action.

Two significant milestones came in 1987, when in partnership with Channel 4, the group organised a "live gay wedding" on terrestrial television, which in turn was the first same-sex kiss between men ever shown on British television, and later when the Hippodrome nightclub in London hosted a high-profile event where the group conducted 22 simultaneous gay weddings. Another came in 1999 when 11 couples, including the activist Barbara Smoker, were married on-screen for the BBC Two show Gaytime TV. A 2000 "kiss-in" protest outside Parliament later precipitated Mayor of London Ken Livingstone's London Partnership Register in 2001, which in turn provided inspiration for the 2005 Civil Partnership Act and the Marriage (Same Sex Couples) Act in 2013. LGBT Humanists was also part of the Equal Love Campaign which in 2011 attempted to bring a case to the European Court of Human Rights concerning same-sex civil marriages and opposite-sex civil partnerships.

Alongside Northern Ireland Humanists, LGBT Humanists also campaigned successfully for legal recognition of same-sex marriages in Northern Ireland. In 2019, following the successful passage of a bill to extend marriage equality, humanists paid for billboards across Belfast announcing "Love wins for everyone".

In 2023, LGBT Humanists worked alongside Humanists UK patrons Stephen Fry and Sandi Toksvig to convince the UK Government to grant legal recognition to humanist ceremonies in England and Wales, as is already the case in Scotland and Northern Ireland, arguing that "humanist marriages are an LGBT rights issue", after the Census had shown that 63% of LGBT people were non-religious and fewer than 1% of places of worship conducted same-sex marriages. LGBT couples were therefore much more limited in their options for legal marriages compared to opposite-sex couples. In 2023, to mark 10 years since the passage of the Same-Sex Marriage Act, LGBT Humanists members David Cabreza and Peter McGraith, who had been the first same-sex couple to marry in England in 2014, delivered hundreds of postcards "cordially inviting" the Justice Secretary to recognise humanist marriages in England and Wales. Humanist celebrants from Humanist Society Scotland conducted the first same-sex marriages in Scotland in 2014. A humanist couple also had the first same-sex wedding in England that year, but it had been a civil wedding rather than humanist ceremonies due to these being recognised in Scotland but not yet in England or Wales in 2014.

=== Funerals, memorials, and remembrance ===
In 1994, LGBT Humanists organised a humanist funeral for the gay Olympic figure skating champion John Curry, followed by a humanist memorial service at Conway Hall. Media interest in Curry's funeral helped to promote the availability of humanist funerals to LGBT people who had not heard of the concept; LGBT people have always been less likely to religious than the public at large. Humanist naming ceremonies, originally developed as an alternative to christenings (a way of commemorating a new child while respecting their right to choose for themselves what they believe) also found popularity with transgender people who wanted a way to acknowledge a new name and a new identity in the presence of accepting family and friends.

In 1997, LGBT Humanists organised the first Queer Remembrance Day following Remembrance Sunday in conjunction with Outrage! and Peter Tatchell. The march features decorated LGBT veterans who "as soon as the war was over, were treated as criminals". The ceremony also heard from LGBT refugees from Nazi Germany spoke about their treatment during the war. The act of organising a remembrance ceremony focused on LGBT people was publicly condemned as "distasteful" and "offensive" by the Royal British Legion at the time; the event was organised after the RBL privately refused to include LGBT veterans in the ceremony and had called the request "disgusting". In 1999, LGBT Humanists laid a pink wreath in the shape of a pink triangle at the Centotaph in memory of LGBT victims of Nazi concentration camps. Despite strong opposition at first, Tatchell reported that LGBT contingents were eventually allowed to march as part of the official ceremony. Since 2018, LGBT Humanists has organised a Trans Day of Remembrance ceremony in London, inaugurated by the trans musician and humanist celebrant Adèle Anderson.

=== Ban on conversion therapy ===
In its foundation year, 1979, LGBT Humanists became the first UK-based organised to campaign against so-called conversion therapy, and campaigned throughout the 1980s against the legality of so-called "Christian cure ministries" for gays and lesbians. In 1991, the group wrote to the Anglican Bishop of London when the Church of England promoted an initiative in London to "heal" gays and lesbians through "therapy" and prayer. In 1995, following the suicide of a victim of conversion therapy, it called on the Secretary of State for Health to prohibit so-called Christian "counselling" organisations peddling pseudoscientific therapies. Following a ruling of professional malpractice against a conversion therapy practitioner in 2012, humanists called on the former Archbishop of Canterbury George Carey to retract his support for so-called "gay cure" therapy. Humanists again brought the issue to media attention and to the UN Human Rights Council in 2018, precipitating Theresa May's government to announce a ban on the practice. After successive governments have failed to implement the ban the campaign was ongoing as of 2024, when the UN Human Rights Committee told the UK to implement the ban it promised six years prior.

LGBT Humanists UK remains the only organisation representing LGBT non-religious people and humanists in the UK. LGBT Humanists UK provides fellowship for LGBT non-religious people and continues to lead the fight to ban conversion therapy in the UK. LGBT Humanists works closely with organisations including Stonewall and Faith to Faithless to campaign against so-called 'conversion' therapy and to support and empower survivors of this discredited and harmful practice.

== See also ==
- Pink Triangle Trust

== Sources ==
- Gay and Lesbian Humanist Association (GALHA) by Bishopsgate Institute
- Gay refugees need asylum by Peter Tatchell, writing for The Guardian newspaper
- Consortium
- International Humanist and Ethical Union
- National Secular Society
- GALHA LGBT Humanists on the UK LGBT Archive wiki
- LGBT+ Humanists UK Homepage
