= Catawiki =

Collection and auction site

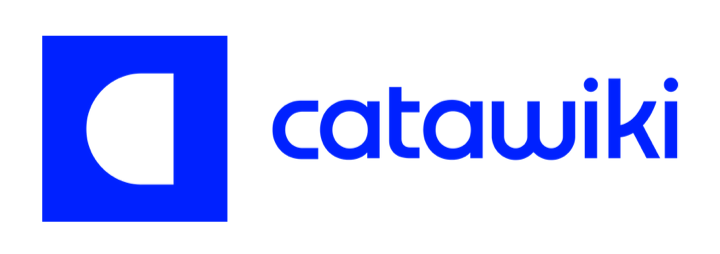
- Website type: Online auction platform
- Creators: René Schoenmakers; Marco Jansen
- CEO: Ravi Vora
- Website: catawiki.com

Catawiki is an online auction platform for buying and selling special items and collectibles. Catawiki was founded in 2008 as an online community for collectors. Since 2011, the company has been hosting weekly online auctions, in various categories such as vintage comic books, model trains, coins, watches, art, jewellery and classic cars.

== History ==
Catawiki was founded by René Schoenmakers, a Dutch comic collector, and Marco Jansen, a Dutch developer. It went online on 10 September 2008 as an online wiki-based compendium of collector's catalogues. First focusing on comics, the database later covered items such as postage stamps, coins and telephone cards. The name "Catawiki" is a portmanteau of the words "catalogue" and "wiki".

Since 2011 Catawiki has been hosting auctions for thousands of different objects. The site was originally in Dutch, but was made available in English in 2011, in French and German in 2012, and in Spanish, Italian and Chinese in 2015.

== Business model ==
Catawiki has been curating weekly auctions since 2011, across a number of categories such as art, books, curiosa, model trains, stamps, wine and classic cars. Catawiki's auctions are online-only. Bids are open for all to see. Winners pay what they bid via a secure payment service to receive the object from the seller. Catawiki operates a network of over 240 experts who value, authenticate and curate objects. The site makes money by charging a Buyer Protection Fee of 9% + €3 and the Seller Fee of 12.5% (ex VAT) of the sale price.

== Notable auctions ==
- Star Wars Darth Vader helmet with Swarovski crystals, €3,000 (December 2020)
- Esquel meteorite, €4,900 (February 2014)
- DeLorean DMC-12, sold for €20,500 (September 2014)
- Jaw of a T-rex, €10,000 (November 2014)
- Macallan Anniversary Malt (over 50 years old), €14,500 (January 2015)
- Signed first Tintin comic book (Tintin au pays des Soviets), €30,000 (May 2015)
- A bottle of Romanée-Conti Grand Cru, €4,500 (May 2015)
- Lego Star Wars – Millennium Falcon set, €4,700 (June 2015)
- Oil on canvas by Aristarkh Lentulov, €24,000 (August 2015)
- Porsche 356 from 1960, sold for €165,000 (October 2015)
- Tintin book, one of c.10 exemplars, used by Hergé, £61,050 (September 2017)
- A collection of 2017 Domaine de la Romanée-Conti, €34,000 (July 2020)
- A Chateau Lafite Rothschild Vertical: 1969 – 2016, €28,000 (January 2021)
- Tintin book Explorers on the Moon (B30) with dedications by Hergé and several members of Apollo program crews, €71,000 (September 2025)

== See also ==
- List of wikis
