= WikEM =

Medical website and point-of-care phone application

- Website type: wiki
- Available in: English
- Owner: OpenEM Foundation
- Website: www.WikEM.org
- Registration: required (to edit)

WikEM is wiki-based medical website and point-of-care phone application for emergency medicine clinicians. WikEM is owned by OpenEM Foundation, a 501(c)(3) nonprofit organization. WikEM initially started as a database created from notes and checklists passed from resident class to subsequent resident class at the Harbor-UCLA emergency medicine residency program. In 2009, WikEM was launched as a free wiki-based website and phone application that was universally available to all residency programs and global practitioners. As of October 2019, WikiEM has about 4,050 content pages.

Emergency medicine practitioners have been quick to adopt smart phone applications, including WikEM, for use as point-of-care medical references. WikEM has been listed as a key reference for emergency medicine physicians, residents, medical students, nurses, and paramedics.

== Reliability ==
Although the use of wiki-type software has become common for a variety of purposes, several sources have questioned whether the wiki-based format of WikEM is reliable enough to use as a source for medical information, with arguments similar to questions about the reliability of Wikipedia plus the additional concerns of patient safety.

== Free open access meducation ==
Free open access meducation (FOAM) has been described as “medical education for anyone, anywhere, anytime” and WikEM has been described as a key resource in the FOAM movement. WikEM's free, openly accessible content has been specifically noted as an important growing resource for clinicians in the developing world, where access to up to date medical references is more difficult. However, to date, WikEM is limited in this regard in that its content is only available in the English language.

== Mobile apps ==
Although WikEM auto-formats for mobile devices, there are offline applications for Android and IPhone specifically designed for rural and international medicine in austere and Internet-poor environments.

== See also ==
- List of medical wikis
- List of wikis
