= Vienna History Wiki =

Wien Geschichte Wiki
- Website type: Wiki on the history of Vienna
- Available in: German
- Owner: City of Vienna
- Website: www.geschichtewiki.wien.gv.at
- Commercial: no
- Registration: Required for editing (free wien.gv.at user account)
- Launched: September 11, 2014; 12 years ago
- Current status: Active
- Content license: Creative Commons Attribution-NonCommercial-NoDerivatives 4.0 International (with exceptions)

Vienna History Wiki (German: Wien Geschichte Wiki) is a freely accessible online collection of reference works in German about the history of Vienna. The main content of the wiki are persons, buildings, topographical objects (streets, parks, waters, districts...), organisations, events and other items (such as special German expressions used in Vienna). It is written by Municipal and Provincial Archives of Vienna and Vienna City Library staff as well as external experts, and all content is subject to an editorial process and approved before publication.

== Background ==
The "Vienna History Wiki" was built up by the Municipal and Provincial Archives of Vienna (MA8) and the Vienna City Library (MA 9). It was opened to the public in 2014. It is a historical knowledge platform of the City of Vienna aiming at combining knowledge from the city administration with those of external experts. Amongst several departments of the City of Vienna, other project partners are continuously working on the content, e. g. the Vienna Museum, Jewish Museum Vienna, Association for the History of Vienna, Austrian Institute of Historical Research, Centre for Environmental History, Austrian Mediathek.

Cornerstone of the wiki are more than 27,000 articles (31,000 entries) of the six-volume encyclopedia "Historisches Lexikon Wien" edited by Felix Czeike (2nd edition 2004).

The Vienna History Wiki uses Semantic MediaWiki, where facts from the wiki pages are stored and can be retrieved inside the wiki as well as exported in different formats (e. g. JSON or RDF). Since 2021 is mainly uses Schema.org as vocabulary for the ontology. The wiki is still growing, and demonstrates a satisfied user base

== See also ==
- List of online encyclopedias
- List of wikis
