= Edwin Charles Steinbrecher =

American astrologer

- Born: Edwin Charles Steinbrecher
- Died: January 26, 2002 (aged 71)
- Other name: Ed.Steinbrecher
- Occupations: Astrological data collector, teacher, writer
- Known for: Meditation Teachings and Astrological data collection
- Notable work: Founder of D.O.M.E.
- Spouse: Suzanne Gross

Edwin Charles Steinbrecher (April 4, 1930 – January 26, 2002), was an American astrologer, lecturer, teacher, metaphysician and an astrological data collector, noted for works related to meditation and his precise Steinbrecher Collection, entered on John Woodsmall's Pathfinder Program. He taught and lectured on the occult sciences, specifically in relation to practising meditation and wrote the book titled, The Inner Guide to Meditation. The book has been referred in works of authors, in their books on esoteric subjects, meditation and intuition .

== Biography ==
Steinbrecher was born in Chicago, Illinois, to Edwin E. Steinbrecher and Helen Clara (Siska) Steinbrecher. He was raised in a family of astrologers, including his mother, several aunts and uncles. He learned the language of astrology from the age of five and took classes with his aunt and godmother, Josephine Siska. A restless youth, he joined the Army as a conscientious objector, serving in the medical corps. On April 23, 1953, he volunteered for experiments in lowering body temperature, in order that army medics could find how best to readjust the temperature of soldiers after freezing-trauma. During the procedure, he "flat-lined" in an NDE. During the few minutes when he was clinically dead, he experienced such bliss that it changed him forever and affirmed his life direction.

He founded D.O.M.E., the Inner Guide Meditation Center, in Santa Fe, New Mexico, in 1975. The center moved to Los Angeles, California, in 1984. Steinbrecher died of emphysema on January 26, 2002. Shortly before his death, he sold his data collection to Lois Rodden's Astrodatabank, where his collection was completely integrated. His collection of original birth records has been scanned by the current owner of Astrodatabank, the Swiss company Astrodienst AG, in 2014, and is available to researchers in PDF firmat.

== Personal life ==
Ed married Suzanne Gross on June 17, 1955. Suzanne May Gross and Edwin Charles Steinbrecher exchanged marriage vows in St. Mary's rectory Saturday afternoon. They later divorced. Apparently, Ed Steinbrecher was bisexual and later a celibate, according to his interview ('Sex with God') to Mark Thompson published in Gay Soul (Harper San Francisco, 1995).

== Notable work ==
- The Inner Guide Meditation - A Primer for the 21st Century. 288 pages. Dome Foundation, Santa Fe, NM 1977; Blue Feather Press, Santa Fe U.S.A, 1975; 1978; Thorsons, 1982; HarperCollins, 1982; Red Wheel/Weiser, York Beach (Maine, U.S.A.), 1987; 1988; 1994; 2006; 2010; ISBN 0877286574; Aquarian Press, Wellingborough (UK) 1988 ISBN 0850307805; Motilal Banarsidass (New Age Books), New Delhi 2002 ISBN 978-8178220604)
  Online at Scribd
