= Open problem =

Unsolved problem in science and mathematics

In science and mathematics, an open problem or an open question is a known problem which can be accurately stated, and which is assumed to have an objective and verifiable solution, but which has not yet been solved (i.e., no solution for it is known).

In the history of science, some of these supposed open problems were "solved" by means of showing that they were not well-defined. In mathematics, many open problems are concerned with the question of whether a certain definition is or is not consistent.

Two notable examples in mathematics that have been solved and "closed" by researchers in the late twentieth century are Fermat's Last Theorem and the four-color theorem. An important open mathematics problem solved in the early 21st century was the Poincaré conjecture.

Open problems exist in all scientific fields. For example, one of the most important open problems in biochemistry is the protein structure prediction problem – how to predict a protein's structure from its sequence.

== See also ==
- Lists of unsolved problems (by major field)
- Hilbert's problems
- Millennium Prize Problems
- Conjecture
- Wikenigma, wiki for open problems
