= Pink Triangle Trust =

British LGBTQ organization

Pink Triangle Trust (PTT)
- Website: https://www.thepinktriangletrust.com

The Pink Triangle Trust is a UK-registered charity that offers educational materials about LBGTQ issues and the application of humanism to the study of these issues. Its long-standing secretary was George Broadhead.

== History ==
The Trust was established in 1992. It is named after the pink triangle, a symbol originally used as a badge in Nazi concentration camps to identify gay men, but which has since become an international symbol of gay pride and the gay rights movement. The Pink Triangle Trust offered affirmation ceremonies for same sex couples.

== Gay & Lesbian Humanist ==
The PTT was the publisher of Gay & Lesbian Humanist magazine, more commonly known as G&LH. From 1994 to 2005, G&LH was a print-only magazine, and was published quarterly. During this time, it was edited by George Broadhead (1994–2000) and Andy Armitage (2000–2005). In 2008, G&LH was relaunched as an online-only magazine, with Mike Foxwell as its editor. The Gay Humanist Quarterly (GHQ) replaced the G&LH when South African journalist Brett Lock took over the editorship from 2005 – 2007.

In 2011, the PTT launched a new on-line magazine, The Pink Humanist, under the editorship of veteran gay journalist Barry Duke, who also edits the Freethinker magazine.

The PTT also has a presence on Facebook.

== See also ==
- LGBT Humanists UK
