= Stepes =

American translation service company

- Founded: December 2015; 10 years ago in San Francisco, California
- Founder: Carl Yao
- Website: stepes.com

Stepes (pronounced /stɛps/) is an online translation and localization service which pairs a business in need of translation with professional translators in over 100 languages. The company was founded in San Francisco, California, in December 2015 and introduced the world's first chat-based mobile translation technology. The Stepes platform is powered by an AI-enabled Translation Management System with cloud-based translation memory searches, continuous terminology management, and workflow automation. It can match in various industry and domain fields and works with a variety of content formats like documents, videos, websites, and software.

== Development ==
Stepes was developed in conjunction with CSOFT International, a localization company with headquarters in Beijing and San Francisco. Stepes founder, Carl Yao, is also the creator of TermWiki, a social knowledge network for industry and domain terminology in 100 languages.

The name "Stepes" is a reference to the Eurasian steppes, from which the majority of the world's current spoken languages originated.

The software was launched online in early December 2015 with iOS and Android apps launched later. In May 2016, Stepes launched Stepes Translate, an online human translation interface that resembles Google Translate but is powered by human translators.

== Chat-based translation ==
Chat-based translation describes the way Stepes feeds content to be translated to its translators on a smaller mobile screen. The Stepes mobile app breaks down longer documents into smaller chunks and sends them to the translator in the form of a text. Translators respond with their translation, resulting in a back-and-forth "chat" which the Stepes app automatically compiles into a full translated document. Translators can also swipe left or right to view the full translated text or the full original text.

Stepes holds multiple patents in the US and in China for its chat-based translation interface, swipe left and right for context review and software.

== Stepes Translate ==
Stepes Live uses a traditional side by side interface of machine translation platforms like Google Translate. Users enter text into the source field which is translated by a human translator through the Stepes mobile app. Requesting users can see their translation progress live. For most requests, the translation is completed within minutes and appears in the target field for the requesting user to see.

== Mobile translation approach ==
Mobile translation is the process for human translators to translate content directly on their mobile devices. Stepes uses only human translators (rather than machine translation) to translate content. In this modality, translations are done through a mobile phone using the Stepes mobile translation app or through Stepes' browser-based application. The result is that translators can work from both desktop and mobile devices. As of 2014, there were only around 250,000 professional translators but 3.65 billion bilingual people in the world. Stepes currently has a network of 60,000 translators.

Language industry experts have called mobile translation the beginning of "Big Translation, large-scale translation efforts by people speaking two or more languages." Big Translation requires leveraging existing technological tools to scale up translation capabilities to a global level that matches current communication and information generation needs.

== See also ==
- Mobile translation
- Language localisation
