= Wikenigma =

Wiki for open scientific problems

- Website type: Online encyclopedia
- Available in: English
- Founder: Martin Gardiner
- Website: wikenigma.org.uk
- Advertising: No
- Commercial: No
- Registration: Optional
- Launched: 2016; 10 years ago
- Current status: Active
- Content license: CC BY-NC-SA 4.0
- Written in: PHP (DokuWiki)

Wikenigma is a wiki which documents open problems ("known unknowns") across various scientific fields.

== History ==
With the aim of creating a collection of the unknowns in science, the site was founded in 2016 by Martin Gardiner (not to be confused with Martin Gardner), a former contributor to Improbable Research, which hosts the satirical Ig Nobel prize. The wiki grew to have 500 entries by 2020, and as of May 2026 has 1280 entries. The site was mentioned by internet personality Annie Rauwerda, who runs Depths of Wikipedia social media accounts.

== Content ==
The site is dedicated to "documenting fundamental gaps in human knowledge", per the wiki home page. Gardiner acts as a curator for the site, and says he rejects entries which are unfalsifiable. Most entries are short, but provide links to other scholarly sources for the readers to investigate further. Big Think commented that the site helps to counter the feeling that the sciences are complete by showing the unknowns we have yet to discover. Only a few entries have been marked as "resolved" since their creation. One of them is the beeswax wreck mystery, which was resolved when a fisherman discovered the missing shipwreck buried under boulders.

Some of the listed unknowns include:

- Why humans blush
- Origins of golf
- Cause of the Mayan collapse

The site is licensed under the Creative Commons Attribution-Noncommercial-Share Alike 4.0 International license, which allows noncommercial use of the contents, but prohibits for-profit AI scraping. The wiki uses the DokuWiki software.
