= Lois Rodden =

American astrologer (1928–2003)

- Born: Lois Mae Fast; May 22, 1928; Lang, Canada
- Died: June 5, 2003 (aged 75); Yucaipa, California, US
- Occupations: Astrologer, astrological data collector
- Years active: 1968–2003
- Known for: Rodden Rating System
- Notable work: Astro-Databank
- Spouse: George Rodden
- Children: Amy Rodden, Baby Rodden, Betsy Rodden, Dana Rodden, J on Rodden, Lynn Rodden

Lois Rodden (born Lois Mae Fast; 22 May 1928 – 5 June 2003) was an American astrologer and astrological data collector, known primarily as the founder of Astrodatabank. She was a pioneer in raising awareness of the sourcing of data being foundational in the credibility of astrology.

== Early life ==
Lois was born Lois Mae Fast on May 22, 1928, at 12:22 am MST (rectified by her) in Lang, Saskatchewan, Canada.

Rodden's study of astrology with the Church of Light, began in 1962 when she moved to Los Angeles.

== Career ==
She sold her first astrology article in February 1968, and in September 1968, was invited to become a charter member of Professional Astrologers Inc. At the same time, she was invited to give a series of astrology lectures in San Jose and to teach at the Hollywood Astrological Society. She believed that her career as an astrologer began at that time.

Beginning around 1973, she built up a clientele mainly of people in the entertainment industry, keeping to practical rather than psychological concerns in the client's charts. In 1976, she wrote a list of transit definitions for one of the first computer companies to sell monthly forecasts. She also wrote Sun signs for the astrology scrolls that sell from vending machines, annual sun sign books for checkout stands and astrologically based advertising copy.

In 1985, Rodden moved to a less urban part of California to concentrate more on research than clients. She first went to Europe in 1990. Lois was an active member of Inland Empire Mensa.

== Publications ==
In addition to being editor/publisher of the long-running journal, Data News Rodden wrote five books of astrological data (the Astro-Data series), and three textbooks, The Mercury Method of Chart Comparison; Modern Transits, and Money, How to Find it With Astrology.

Of her publication, she said:

it was always a cottage industry. It was my voice, my way to reach people with corrections and updated data, and the best way to trade data with my colleagues and fellow data-freaks.

(Data News, August 2001).

== Astro-Databank and the Rodden Rating System ==
Rodden was best known for collecting exact data of births and times of public figures and celebrities. Lois Rodden applied her rating system to all the older US data she had collected. This came from astrological organizations, data collections, and the astrological magazines that were popular during the 1930s and 1940s.

She emphasised the importance of calculating charts using time zones, time signatures, longitudes and latitude, deploring the tendency of many astrologers to use inaccurate or non-sourced information as an easy alternative to proper research.

Rodden had high standards - she believed in a kind of public responsibility for the astrologer to choose "clean " (accurate) data over the flawed type ("dirty"). She constantly lobbied publishers, editors and fellow astrologers to make them aware of her concerns. Over 40 years, she amassed tens of thousands of data, both private and public, and called her business Astro-Databank. She would sell a birth record to anyone who wanted it for $5 over the phone.

After meeting computer programmer Mark McDonough, they developed her data collection of astrological details on thousands of notable people into an online resource, now offered for free. The repository is a tool for astrologers to formulate accurate birth charts for distribution, reference, study and research.

== Rodden rating system ==
RATING	AA	A	B	C	DD	X
SOURCE	Birth Certificate Available	From Friend	From Biography	Caution	Dirty Data	Date without time

The Rodden Rating system is used for astrology articles.

Lois Rodden requested other astrologers and astrological data collectors to explain their various data collection with a plea:

Give the source of your data – and put the source on every chart.

- from her book (Profiles of Women).

== Books ==
- Mercury Method of Chart Comparison. American Federation of Astrologers Inc., 1973 ISBN 0866901507 ISBN 978-0866901505
- Modern Transits. American Federation of Astrologers Inc., 1978 ISBN 0866901515 ISBN 978-0866901512
- Astro-Data I: Profiles of Women. (mit Betsy Rodden) Data Newz Revised edition, 1996 ISBN 0963371630 ISBN 978-0963371638
- Astro-Data II: American Book of Charts. 445 pages. American Federation of Astrologers Inc; Revised edition 1984 ISBN 0917086236 ISBN 978-0917086236
- Astro-Data III: Occult/ General Collection. American Federation of Astrologers Inc., 1986, 1992. 265 Pages. ISBN 0866902937 ISBN 978-0866902939
- Astro-Data IV: Culture Collection. American Federation of Astrologers Inc., 1992 ISBN 0866903550 ISBN 978-0866903554
- Astro-Data V: Profiles of Crime. Data Newz, 1992
- Money: How to Find It With Astrology. 280 Pages. Data Newz 1998. American Federation of Astrologers 2006 ISBN 0866905642 ISBN 978-0866905640

== Awards ==
1992, UAC Regulus Award for Enhancing Astrology's Image.
2002 UAC Award for Lifetime Achievement

== Personal life ==
Lois married George Rodden, an aircraft engineer and part-time musician, they had six children, one deceased. These were Amy, Baby, Betsy, Dana, Jon and Lynn Rodden. The family lived in the San Francisco Bay area for ten years before settling in the Los Angeles area where George Rodden worked for Ford Marketing Corporation and conducted youth symphonies as an avocation. In 1968, they separated, divorcing the following year.

== Death ==
Rodden died on June 5, 2003, at 8.30 am PDT, in Yucaipa, California.
