= Base de datos =

Spanish-language collaborative online encyclopedia

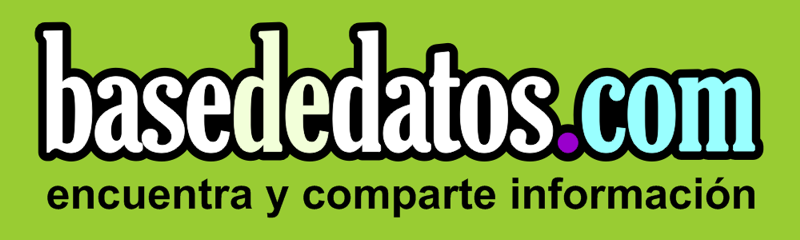
- Website type: Encyclopedia
- Available in: Spanish
- Website: basededatos.com
- Registration: Optional
- Launched: December 08, 2002
- Current status: Active

Base de datos is a collaborative online encyclopedia written in the Spanish language launched on 8 December 2002, currently has more than 14,500 articles on all kinds of topics.

== Wiki software ==
This website has developed its own wiki software called AngelCode with which users can edit articles without registering. However, registered users can use functions whose use is limited by the user experience and to avoid vandalism and copyright problems. For example, only users who have written a number of articles can upload images and photographs.

A difference against other wikis is that the edit history is limited to the last revised edition. Once an edit of Basededatos.com approve an edition, the previous history can not be displayed, and you can not go back to an earlier point.

== See also ==
- Wikipedia
- Citizendium
- Baidu Baike (Chinese)
- Enciclopedia Libre Universal en Español (Spanish)
- List of online encyclopedias
