= Astrodatabank =

Collection of astrological data

- Website type: Internet encyclopedia
- Available in: English
- Website: astro.com/astro-databank
- Commercial: No
- Current status: Active

Astrodatabank logo

Astrodatabank is a wiki website containing a collection of astrological data. The freely accessible database features the birth details and associated birth charts of public figures and mundane events. The collection was started by astrologer, Lois Rodden in 1979. Astrodatabank is currently owned and maintained by the Swiss company Astrodienst and is published in English.

== History ==
In 1979, Lois Rodden started publishing birth data with her book, Profiles of Women. Eventually this led onto the formation of Astrodatabank. Mark McDonough developed the Astrodatabank database work using the astrology birth data collected by Lois Rodden over 40 years of research. Six months before Lois Rodden died, Lois named Pat Taglilatelo as her successor. The data collection of another lifelong collector, Edwin Charles Steinbrecher, was integrated into the database during the next two years.

In July 2005, McDonough gave Richard Smoot ownership of the company. Astrodatabank was later bought by the Swiss company Astrodienst AG, of Alois Treindl, in 2008, and converted into a wiki project and made freely accessible to all.

Astrodatabank as a wiki was released on 12 March 2009, with 72,271 pages, in English. The names Astrodatabank, Astro-Databank, AstroDatabank, and ADB refer to the one and same project Astrodatabank.

== Application and Usage ==
The contents and data of the wiki have been recommended for the purpose of research related to astrological studies. The project has been referred to by the National Council for Geocosmic Research for astrological research and has been recommended by Astrological Association of Great Britain as a large collection of verified astrological charts and a useful resource for scientific research.

Researchers have imported Astrodatabank birth chart data into the Statistical Package for the Social Sciences (SPSS) for analysis. They claim that Astrodatabank sets the standards for rigorous astrological methodology and meet social scientific research design standards.

Export files of the AstroDienst database were used by the open source Python program TkAstroDb to analyze the contents of the Astrodatabank in a more blunt statistical way. TkAstroDb was written by Tanberk Celalettin Kutlu. It produces spreadsheets of the major statistical data found in the ADB export files, like data on ADB categories. The resulting gigabytes of statistical astrological data on ADB categories were published online as excel files by the former ADB editor Sjoerd Visser. The conclusion of The ADB Research Group was, that almost all claimed astrological variation could simply be explained by the sampling error, in contrary to the persistent irrational belief of astrologers that astrologically seen chance does not exist. The ADB researchers concluded that all statistically seen relevant astrological factors were too small to be predictive at the individual level. And that the large effects found in smaller ADB samples, were statistically seen neglectable when taking into account the 11 degrees of freedom involved with the postulated astrological factors. Impressive results were not found. The ADB categories just behaved like random ADB samples without confirming any astrological theory. Even if most biased astrologers and ADB Editors still believe in astrology.

The Astrodatabank has been used for astrological predictions by astrologers. The database has served as an important source of information related to notable people.

Research studies using Astrodatabank to replicate the original results of a successful test conducted by students of statistics class of Lake Forest College has been attempted. The information provided on Astrodatabank, has been used for work related to history, and for reference work.

The contents of Astrodatabank has details of time of an event or person, with a related biography, used also for studying the relation of charts to events in public lives.

== Birth Data is recorded and rated ==
Astrodatabank has a variety of astrological data collections. The data includes the birth details of celebrities, public figures, and Royal births. The time and dates of significant events are also included.

Editors and Astrological data collectors contribute to Astrodatabank entries. Entries are first reviewed by the main editor for reliability and notability, before publication.

Astrodatabank birth entries are ranked according to the Lois Rodden Rating system. This requires full citation of source notes which detail the reference to the origin of the datum collected. Entries are updated to reflect the most recent and most accurate information. Originally the highest rating for accuracy was A. At the suggestion of Marion March, the AA category was included to distinguish between data based on personal memory and that supported by a birth certificate. The least reliable rating, DD refers to so called "dirty data". These are from a third rate source or where the datum is speculative or contradictory or dubious. A DD rating can apply to an entry with multiple claims of different birth data from equally reliable sources.

Lois Rodden Rating System
RATING:-	AA	A	B	C	DD	X
SOURCE	Birth Certificate Available	From Memory	From Biography	Caution	Dirty Data	Date without time

== Data Type ==
A research article on the cognitive simulation of AstroDatabank records by using the Artificial Intelligence System – AIDOS, was published. The technology of simulation is described and the most important results are discussed.

The data from Astrodatabank has been used for statistical studies in astrology and for studying patterns to account for human behavior. The Astrodatabank data has been referenced by authors and writers as a source of information and data, in magazines and in their published books.

== Technology ==
Astrodatabank uses the wiki software MediaWiki with some self-created extensions to provide astrological charts.

== See also ==
- Liz Greene
