= Stadtwiki Karlsruhe =

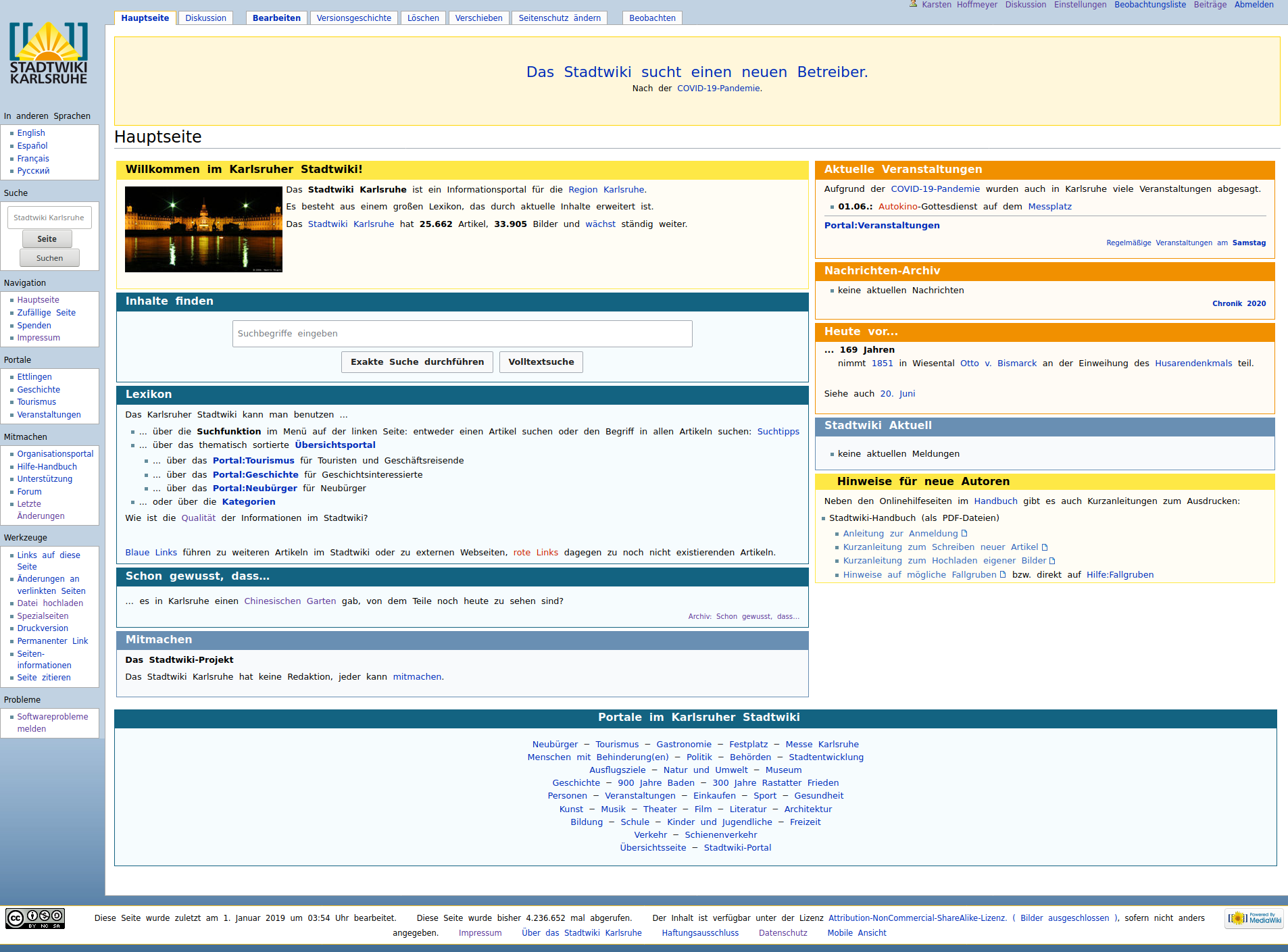
- Website type: City wiki
- Available in: English, German, Spain, France, Russian
- Owner: Bildungsverein Region Karlsruhe e.V.
- Creator: Hauke Löffler
- Website: ka.stadtwiki.net
- Commercial: No
- Registration: Optional (required to edit pages)
- Launched: 22 July 2004
- Current status: Active
- Content license: CC BY-NC-SA

Stadtwiki Karlsruhe is a city wiki of the German city Karlsruhe and its surroundings. In 2009 it was ranked as largest city wiki in the world by article count, but has since been overtaken by other wikis.

== History ==
The wiki was founded by the former pupil Hauke Löffler on 22 July 2004. Its first version was running PmWiki; later the wiki was migrated to MediaWiki.

It is hosted by the voluntary association "Bildungsverein Region Karlsruhe e.V." (e.V. = Eingetragener Verein).

== Content ==
Stadtwiki Karlsruhe contains information on all topics that are related to Karlsruhe and the surrounding region. It provides detailed information and links on geography, nature, history, politics, religion, education, culture, social affairs, sports, business and transport.

The wiki also provides information on the subject of tourism and leisure destinations, gastronomy guide, clubs and venues, and acts specifically as an event calendar. The only relevance criterion is a relation with Karlsruhe.

In October 2008 Stadtwiki Karlsruhe was expanded by an English and a French edition, in September 2009 by a Russian edition. These foreign-language editions of the wiki, however, have been discontinued in the years 2018–2021.

As of September 2023, Stadtwiki Karlsruhe contains over 26,000 articles and 34,000 pictures by over 8,000 authors.

== License ==
Content is availably under a Non-commercial Creative Commons license (by-nc-sa).
