= Copyright Evidence =

Encyclopedia of empirical studies on copyright

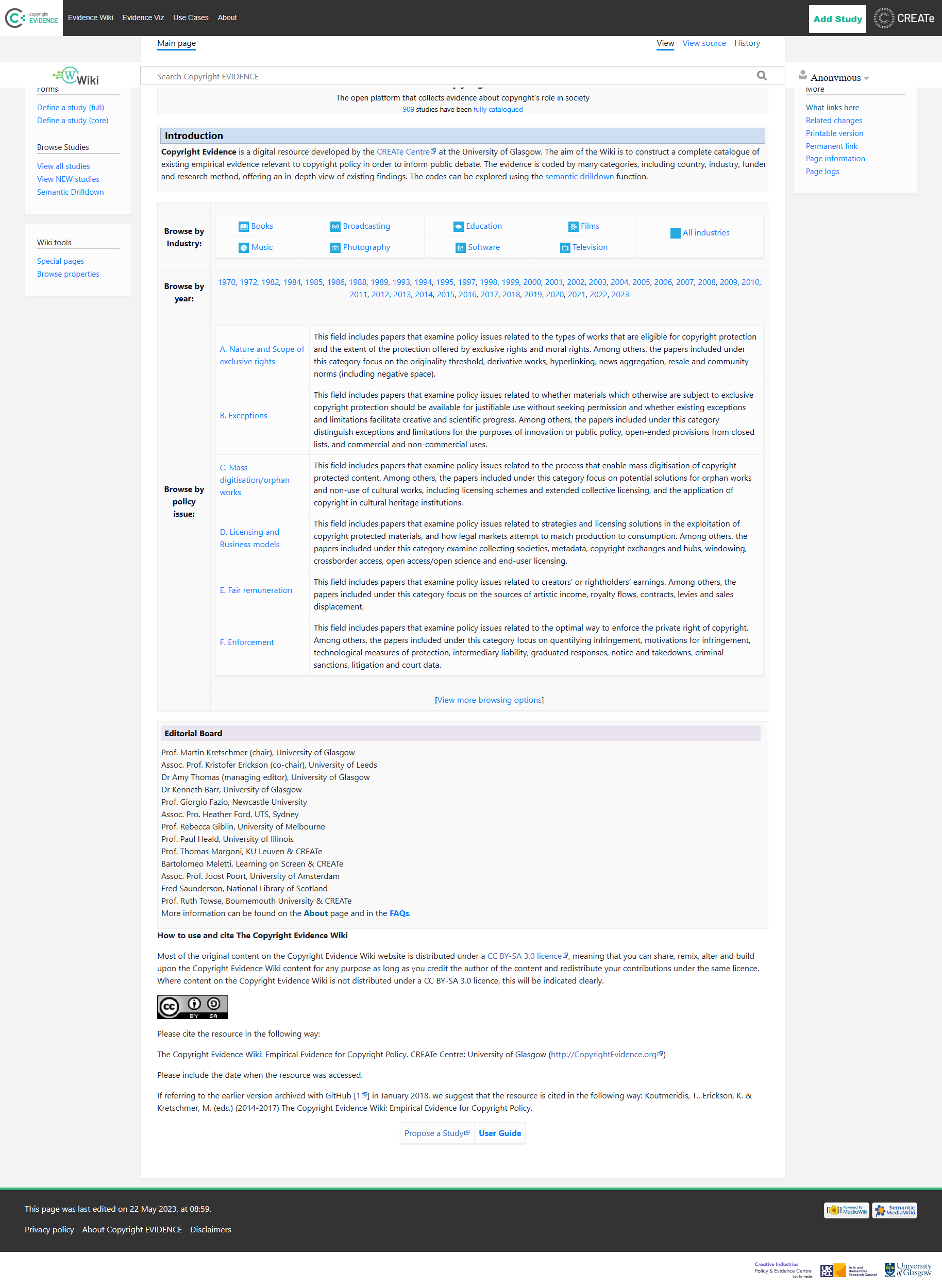
- Screenshot Copyright Evidence wiki home page in December 2023
- Website type: Internet encyclopedia project; Wiki
- Available in: English
- Owner: University of Glasgow
- Website: copyrightevidence.org
- Commercial: No
- Registration: Optional (required to edit pages)
- Launched: 2014
- Current status: Active
- Content license: Creative Commons Attribution Share-Alike 3.0

Copyright Evidence is an English language wiki encyclopedia of empirical studies on copyright. The website categorises legal studies on copyright through open collaboration and the use of wiki-based editing system MediaWiki. It exists to inform the public and policy development based on evidence. It was set up and run by CREATe at the University of Glasgow.

== History ==
Copyright Evidence was established in 2014 by Theo Koutmeridis, Kris Erickson, and Martin Kretschmer, as a project undertaken by the CREATe research centre. The project aims to be a consolidated and interdisciplinary “central source” for evidence-based copyright studies, where users can examine findings and methodology transparently.

An editorial board was established in December 2017, which included the appointment of a sub-editor responsible for growing the existing base of studies.

== Methodology ==
Initial studies eligible for Copyright Evidence were identified using a snowball sampling methodology, beginning with a literature review by Watson, Zizzo and Fleming. Thereafter: 103 working papers and pre-prints were identified through the SSRN e-journal Intellectual Property: Empirical Studies (published between November 1996 and July 2015); 81 studies via literature reviews by Handke, Kretschmer, and Kheria; and 50 governmental reports as proposed by CREATe doctoral candidates.

Ongoing growth of Copyright Evidence is achieved by search-based identifications. A literature review, conducted by the University of Illinois, confirmed the veracity and comprehensiveness of Copyright Evidence in late-2018.

== Format ==
Copyright Evidence catalogues all “empirical studies on copyright in an attempt to inform policy interventions based on rigorous evidence”. Permitted studies may also include multi-disciplinary elements, and do not need to be strictly legal in nature. Copyright Evidence is currently closed for unauthenticated user submissions, with relevant studies being identified and coded by a community of CREATe research assistants.

Each entry details the main findings of the relevant study, a description of the data involved, and relevant policy considerations. Studies are also categorised (amongst other factors) by country, JEL code, and research method. Iconographic indicators are used to identify the relevant industry, fundamental issues, and policy areas.

== Findings ==
Copyright Evidence currently holds details of over 600 evidence-based studies on copyright, and acts as a dynamic literature review platform which is open to text and data mining.

Mining and visualisation tools were explored during the 2016 EUHackathon, which identified certain clusters of cross-referencing between key related studies. Governmental reports, for example, tend to cross-reference other governmental reports, but less so academic evidence on copyright.

Copyright Evidence visualisations provide summary statistics on the landscape of the indexed studies. These demonstrate how the majority of copyright studies focus on: (a) the sound recording and music publishing industry; (b) understanding consumption/use (e.g. determinants of unlawful behaviour, user-generated content, social media), and; (c) enforcement (quantifying infringement, criminal sanctions, intermediary liability, graduated response, litigation & court data, commercial VS non-commercial, education & awareness).

Copyright Evidence is cited as a resource to support the use of empirical evidence in informing copyright policy.
