= UK LGBT History Project =

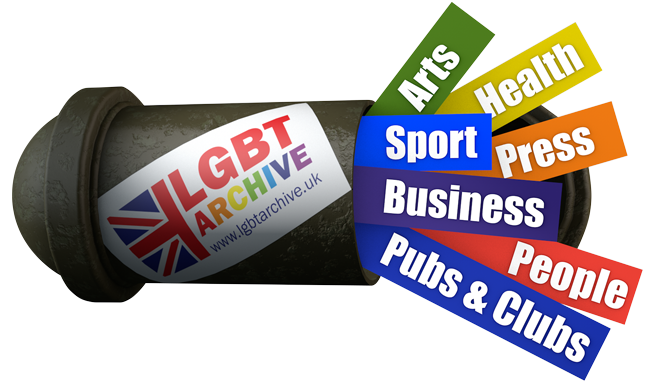
"Time Capsule" image symbolising the UK LGBT Archive as preserving a snapshot of UK LGBT History for future generations

The UK LGBT History Project, known for a time as the UK LGBT Archive, is an LGBT online encyclopaedia for the United Kingdom It was created in June 2011 by Jonathan Harbourne using MediaWiki software. Content is published under the Creative Commons Attribution-ShareAlike licence. By December 2015 the site had "over 3600 articles... Each article explains the history of a character, event or important document and explains its special place in queer history." By 2 September 2026 it had 5013 articles (pages).

It was launched at the pre-launch in November 2011 for LGBT History Month 2012.

Sport is one of the themes of the site, reflecting its origins in connection with 'London 2018', the campaign to bring the Gay Games/Outgames to London in 2018. However it now seeks to cover all aspects of LGBT life in the UK, from the earliest times to the present day. The Project's logo is a time capsule, reflecting the aim of preserving for future generations the history of LGBT people, institutions, and events that would otherwise be forgotten. Indeed, it has recorded a number of LGBT organisations, and venues such as gay pubs, that have disappeared and have needed to be uncovered in archived defunct websites or old newspaper cuttings. While following in large part the approach laid down by Wikipedia, it has a much more relaxed approach to notability, and will cover any UK LGBT-related subject for which a record exists.

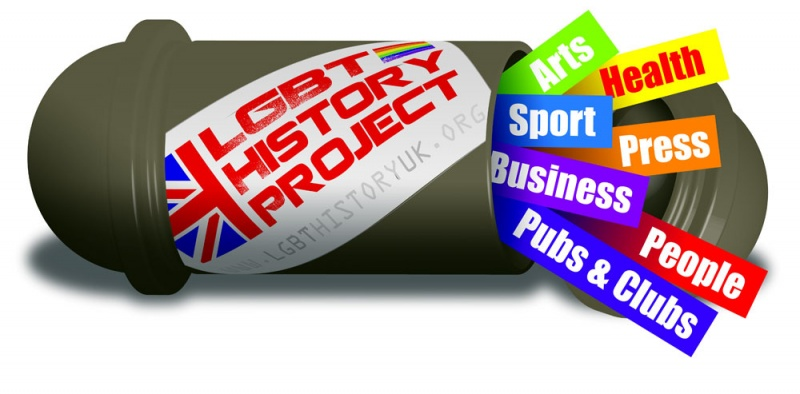
Previous LGBT History Project Time Capsule logo

In terms of geographical coverage, its articles cover the four countries of the United Kingdom, plus the Crown Dependencies (Isle of Man and Channel Islands) with the aim of having an article for every local authority area or significant town.

In December 2015 it was re-launched as the UK LGBT Archive, but has since reverted to its original name.
