= Nukapedia =

Wiki about the Fallout fictional universe

- Logo as of 2022
- Website type: Fan wiki Online encyclopedia
- Owners: Fandom, Inc.
- Creator: Paweł "Ausir" Dembowski
- Website: fallout.fandom.com/wiki/Fallout_Wiki
- Commercial: Yes
- Registration: Optional
- Launched: 7 February 2005
- Current status: Active
- Content license: Creative Commons Attribution-ShareAlike 3.0 Unported

Nukapedia, also known as Fallout Wiki, is a wiki and online encyclopedia about the Fallout fictional universe. It covers all of the Fallout video games, as well as all Fallout related content. The Fallout Wiki runs on MediaWiki and is currently part of the Fandom network. The site is also available in several other languages, including Bulgarian, Chinese, Dutch, French, German, Hebrew, Hungarian, Italian, Japanese, Norwegian, Polish, Portuguese, Russian, Spanish, Swedish and Turkish and Ukrainian.

Originally named simply The Vault, the wiki was split into two independently-run sites: The Vault and Nukapedia, in 2011. The two wikis decided to merge in December 2019, "completing" the process of importing The Vault content to Nukapedia in January 2022.

== History ==
The Vault was founded by Paweł Dembowski and launched on February 7, 2005, initially hosted by Fallout fansite Duck and Cover, as a general source of information about the Fallout universe, focusing mostly on information about the Fallout world, as depicted in Fallout and Fallout 2. Its purpose was to continue the work started by Fallout 2 developer Chris Avellone in his Fallout Bible, which was meant to be a reference guide to the Fallout fictional universe, but was abandoned after Avellone left Black Isle Studios. Since the launch, the wiki has expanded to include the entire Fallout series, both in terms of the fictional universe and in terms of gameplay information and help.

In 2007, because the original host could no longer take the wiki constantly being targeted for various exploits by spammers as well as other attackers, the Vault moved to Wikia, and became one of Wikia's most popular wikis after the release of Fallout 3 by Bethesda Softworks in October 2008. It has broken previous popularity records for gaming wikis on the weekend after the release of Fallout: New Vegas in October 2010, with daily page views topping at 8.8 million (the previous record, 5 million, belonged to WoWWiki). Within the first week of the game's release, the site had 2.5 million unique visitors. In an interview with Eurogamer, the wiki's founder has stated that it has even been used as a source by developers of recent Fallout games, citing one example of lore in Fallout 3 being influenced by The Vault. The Vault has also released some previously unknown information on canceled Fallout projects like the Fallout Extreme 2000 console game and the 1998 cancelled Fallout film project, as well as using its YouTube channel and other social media to make available audio and video Fallout Media. Nukapedia has also worked to make available several Fallout music tracks and cutscenes on its YouTube channel.

== Split ==
In October 2011, over disagreements with Wikia's social focus its founder and many of the administrators moved The Vault to FalloutWiki.com, and later fallout.gamepedia.com, both hosted by Curse. The Wikia version remained, now under the name "Nukapedia". In January 2012, Dembowski was globally banned from Wikia for posting about Curse-hosted wikis on Wikia.

== Merge ==
In 2019, after the Curse network of wikis was purchased by Wikia and both The Vault and Nukapedia became hosted by the same company, administrators of both wikis announced a project to merge the two previously split sites into one again, under the name "Fallout Wiki" (subtitled "Nukapedia + The Vault"). In January 2022, it was announced that the merge was complete and the site will continue forward under Nukapedia branding. The original version of The Vault prior to the merge announcement remains archived.

== Gallery ==
Logo during the merge, 2019–2022

== See also ==
- List of fan wikis
- List of online encyclopedias
- List of wikis
