= List of fan wikis =

A fan wiki is a wiki (Note: A wiki is a form of hypertext publication on the internet which is collaboratively edited and managed by its audience directly through a web browser. A typical wiki contains multiple pages that can either be edited by the public or limited to use within an organization for maintaining its internal knowledge base.) that is created by fans, primarily to document an object of popular culture. Fan wikis cover television shows, film franchises, video games, comic books, sports, and other topics. They are a part of fandoms, which are subcultures dedicated to a common popular culture interest. The digital humanities scholar Jason Mittell stated in 2013 that fan wikis were "[o]ne of the most popular and widespread uses of wikis".

Fan wikis usually operate according to internal policies. Editors reach decisions through discussion and consensus decision-making. Some wikis are more hierarchical, while others operate more collectively. They usually appoint a small group of editors to serve as system operators (sysops) or administrators, who have additional powers to enforce rules. Many fan wikis have rules that require editors to provide citations to reliable sources to verify their claims.

Fan wikis were first published in the early 2000s. Many fan wikis formed out of Wikipedia over disputes among editors about the level of detail that should be provided in articles. These included fans of the television show Battlestar Galactica and the Star Wars franchise, who founded Wookieepedia after facing complaints about the "overabundance of minutiae related to Star Wars appearing on Wikipedia".

In 2004, the Wikipedia co-founder Jimmy Wales and the former Wikipedia board chair Angela Beesley founded Fandom under the name WikiCities, a for-profit wiki hosting service that hosted regional wikis for cities. In 2006, the company attracted venture capital funding and changed its name to Wikia. Wikia then began to assimilate independent fan wikis, such as Memory Alpha (a Star Trek fan wiki) and Wowpedia (a World of Warcraft fan wiki). In the late 2010s—after Fandom and Gamepedia were acquired and consolidated by the private equity firm TPG Inc.—several wikis began to leave the service, including the RuneScape, Zelda, and Minecraft wikis. Those wiki communities cited Fandom's advertising methods, issues with security and outdated software, and corporate control as reasons for migrating.

The following list summarizes fan wikis with articles on Wikipedia.

== Fan wikis ==
Fan wikis
Wiki	Date launched	Status (Note: Current as of December 2025.)	Founder(s)	Most recent wiki hosting service	Subject	Notes	Ref(s).
Battlestar Wiki	February 2005	Live	Joe Beaudoin Jr.	Independent	Battlestar Galactica (American science fiction franchise)		
Heroes Wiki	October 2006	Defunct (2020)	Fan community	Independent	Heroes (American science fiction television series)		
Lostpedia	2005	Live	Kevin Croy	Fandom	Lost (American drama television series)		
Memory Alpha	2003	Live	Dan Carlson and Harry Doddema	Fandom	Star Trek (American science fiction franchise)		
Nukapedia (a.k.a. Fallout Wiki)	2005	Live	Paweł Dembowski	Fandom	Fallout (American video game franchise)	Moved to Fandom in 2007; forked to The Vault by Dembowski in 2011 after he joined Curse LLC as an employee	
Supernatural Wiki	2006	Live	Fan community	Independent	Supernatural (American horror television series)		
Tolkien Gateway	January 1, 2003	Live	Hyarion	Independent	J. R. R. Tolkien		
The Unofficial Elder Scrolls Pages	1995	Live	Dave Humphrey	Independent	The Elder Scrolls		
Wookieepedia	March 2005	Live	Chad Barbry and Steven Greenwood	Fandom	Star Wars (American science fiction franchise)		
Wowpedia	October 2010	Live	Fan community	Fandom	World of Warcraft (American massively multiplayer online role-playing game)	Forked from WoWWiki (then hosted by Fandom) in October 2010 following community vote; hosted by Curse LLC from founding to early 2019, when Curse's Gamepedia wiki hosting service was acquired by Fandom; forked to Warcraft Wiki following community vote in October 2023	

== Sources ==
=== Book chapters and reference work sections ===
- Jones, Henry (2021). "Wikis". In Baker, Mona; Blaagaard, Bolette B.; Jones, Henry; Pérez-González, Luis (eds.). The Routledge Encyclopedia of Citizen Media. Critical Perspectives in Citizen Media (ebook ed.). London: Routledge. ISBN 978-1-315-61981-1.
- Mittell, Jason (2013). "Wikis and Participatory Fandom". In Delwiche, Aaron; Henderson, Jennifer Jacobs (eds.). The Participatory Cultures Handbook (ebook ed.). New York: Routledge. pp. 35–42. ISBN 978-0-203-11792-7.

=== Journal articles ===
- Hunter, Rik (November 2014). "Hypersocial-Interactive Writing: An Audience of Readers-as-Writers". Literacy in Composition Studies. 2 (2): 17–43. doi:10.21623/1.2.2.3. Archived from the original on August 15, 2024.
- Kaplan, Deborah (2010). "Interview with the Super-wiki Admin Team". Interview. Transformative Works and Cultures. 4. doi:10.3983/twc.2010.0200. Archived from the original on August 24, 2024.
- Matthews, Jolie Christine (January–March 2016). "Historical Inquiry in an Informal Fan Community: Online Source Usage and the TV Show The Tudors". Learning Outside of School Strand. The Journal of the Learning Sciences. 25 (1): 4–50. doi:10.1080/10508406.2015.1112285. JSTOR 43828388.
- Mittell, Jason (2009). "Sites of Participation: Wiki Fandom and the Case of Lostpedia". Praxis. Transformative Works and Cultures. 3. doi:10.3983/twc.2009.0118. Archived from the original on October 17, 2023.
- Toton, Sarah (January 17, 2008). "Cataloging Knowledge: Gender, Generative Fandom, and the Battlestar Wiki". Flow. University of Texas at Austin. Archived from the original on May 18, 2024.

=== News and magazines ===
- Bailey, Dustin (October 21, 2022). "The Biggest Zelda Wiki Goes Independent to Fight 'Corporate Consolidation,' Urging Others to Follow Suit". GamesRadar+. Archived from the original on December 12, 2023.
- D'Anastasio, Cecilia (December 13, 2018). "Twitch Sale Of Curse Media Will Combine Two Popular Gaming Wikis". Kotaku. Archived from the original on September 2, 2024.
- Hinman, Michael (March 13, 2006). "Venture Capitalists Invest Wiki-millions". Tampa Bay Business Journal.
- Jackson, Gita (September 28, 2018). "Video Game Wikis Abandon Their Platform After Year Of Problems". Kotaku. Archived from the original on November 1, 2023.
- Larlham, Daniel Jr. (May 2, 2025). "'Older than Google', This Elder Scrolls Wiki Has Been Helping Gamers for 30 Years". Ars Technica. Archived from the original on July 4, 2026.
- Martinelli, Marissa (September 21, 2017). "The Keepers of the Canon". Culturebox. Slate. Archived from the original on May 29, 2024.
- McLean, Thomas J. (May 4, 2007). "Wookieepedia Tracks Star Wars". Variety. Archived from the original on July 18, 2024.
- Oshry, Dave (January 14, 2012). "Fallout Wiki Banned from Wikia for Promoting Curse". Kotaku. Archived from the original on December 16, 2023.
- Stanton, Rich (October 4, 2023). "Minecraft Wiki Completes Exit from Fandom, Gets Ready to Fight Its Own Zombified Corpse". PC Gamer. Archived from the original on October 23, 2023.
- Steyer, Jean-Sébastien (October 2015). "La Vie Dans Star Wars: Une Histoire (Sur)naturelle" [Life in Star Wars: A (Super)natural Story] (PDF). Revue des deux Mondes (in French): 130–137. JSTOR 44435926. Archived (PDF) from the original on September 1, 2024.
- Tossell, Ivor (January 12, 2007). "It's a Wiki, Wiki World Out There". The Globe and Mail. p. R.20. ProQuest 383474262.
- Whitbrook, James (March 30, 2021). "How Star Wars' Biggest Fan Wiki Found Itself in a Fight Over Trans Identity". io9. Gizmodo. Archived from the original on January 10, 2024.

=== Websites ===
- Brian / Admin (2020). "User:Admin/Goodbye". Heroes Wiki. Archived from the original on May 31, 2020.
- Carlson, Dan (August 23, 2016). "How Memory Alpha Helped Star Trek Beyond". TrekCore. Archived from the original on March 3, 2024.
- DiscordianKitty (November 1, 2023). "Wowpedia Has Moved – Now Warcraft Wiki". Wowhead. Archived from the original on September 2, 2024.
- Tolkien Gateway contributors (January 29, 2025). "Tolkien Gateway". Tolkien Gateway.
