= Wookieepedia =

Online Star Wars encyclopedia

Wookieepedia: The Star Wars Wiki
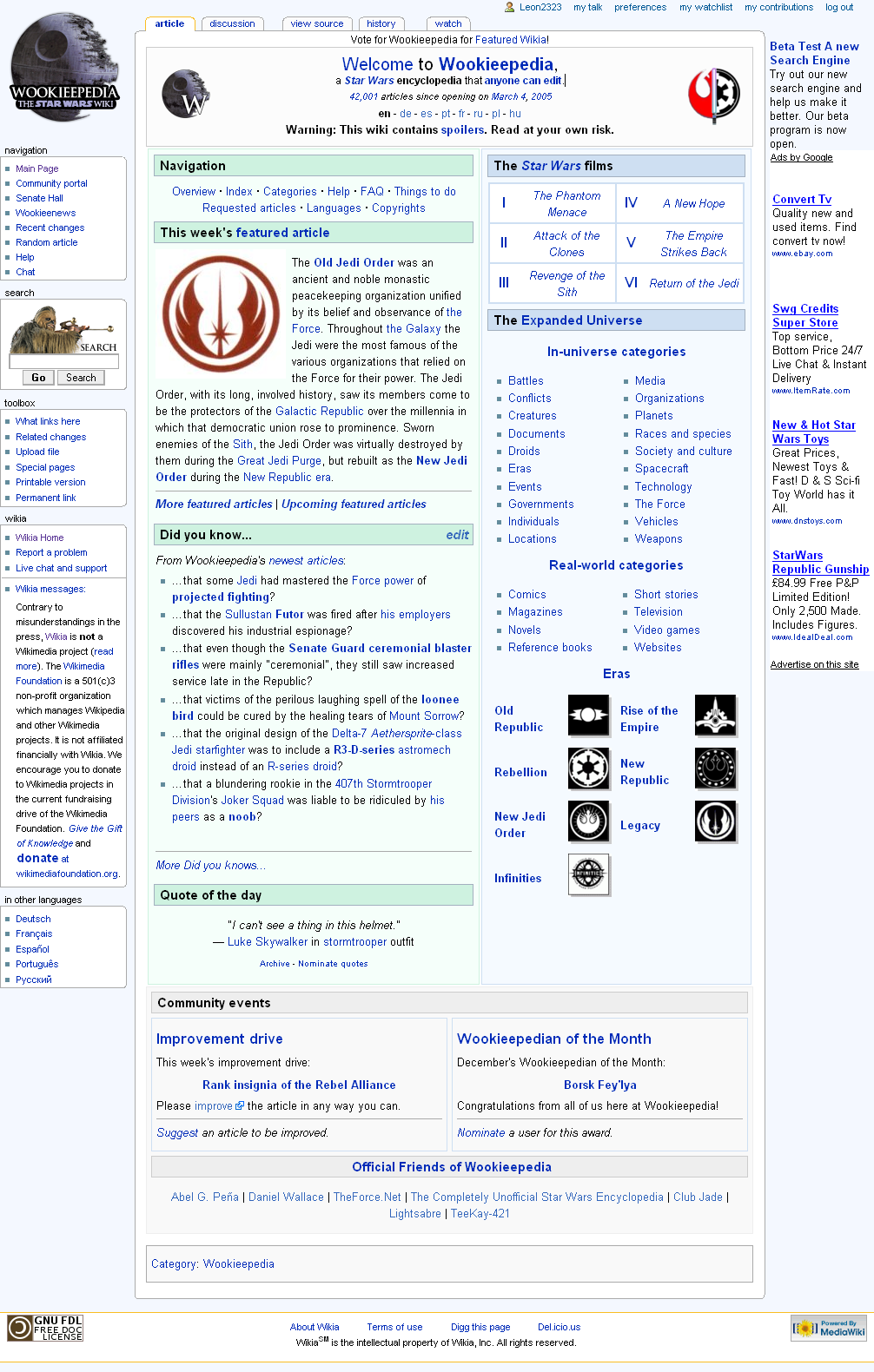
- Screenshot of Wookieepedia in 2007
- Website type: Fan wiki Online encyclopedia
- Owner: Fandom, Inc.
- Creators: Chad Barbry; Steven Greenwood
- Revenue: Advertising
- Website: starwars.fandom.com
- Commercial: Yes
- Registration: Optional
- Launched: March 4, 2005
- Current status: Active with over 220,000 articles (as of September 2026)
- Content license: GFDL (2005–2009); CC BY-SA 3.0 (2009—present)

Wookieepedia: The Star Wars Wiki, or simply Wookieepedia, is an online encyclopedia about the Star Wars universe, including information on all films, books, television series, the Star Wars Expanded Universe, any upcoming Star Wars material, and more. It is a wiki, with some articles reaching up to 60,000 words, and is written almost entirely from an in-universe perspective. The name is a portmanteau of Wookiee and encyclopedia, a pun on the name of Wikipedia, and its logo portrays the incomplete second Death Star, as a visual pun on Wikipedia's incomplete "jigsaw logo".

== History ==
Wookieepedia was conceived by Steven Greenwood and created at the request of hosting site Wikicities by Chad Barbry in 2005. On February 6, 2005, Greenwood and Barbry discussed details on a Wikipedia talk page which led to the wiki's creation. Barbry also conceived the name Wookieepedia. On March 4, 2005, Wookieepedia was launched at Wikicities (now Fandom).

In 2015, it drew 3.7 million monthly visitors. On November 28, 2005, Wookieepedia was selected as the Sci-Fi Channel's "Sci-Fi Site of the Week."

As of April 2026, the English-language version of the wiki contains over 220,000 articles, By early December 2014, it was the seventh-largest Wikia site in terms of article count, ahead of other wikis such as Memory Alpha and WoWWiki. Fandom now hosts Star Wars wikis in many other languages, and Wookieepedia also coordinates its efforts with the German language wiki called Jedipedia.net and the Polish language Biblioteka Ossus.

After the Star Wars Expanded Universe was rebranded as Star Wars Legends and declared non-canon to the franchise in April 2014, Wookieepedia implemented separate "Canon" and "Legends" tabs for subjects that appeared both before and after the continuity reboot. The "Legends" tab only includes information from sources released prior to the 2014 reboot, while the "Canon" tab contains information from works published from 2014 onwards, including the movies released under The Walt Disney Company. Wookieepedia admin Brandon Rhea explained, "that was something that tracked exactly with what Lucasfilm was doing anyway. They called it 'Legends' for a reason. They said these stories are still around and could still be pulled from. So Wookieepedia kind of adopted the same approach." An exception to this rule was made for the content of the Star Wars: The Old Republic MMORPG, which has seen several expansions after 2015 but is still considered "Legends". Both tabs include information from Episodes I-VI and Star Wars: The Clone Wars TV series.

In late March 2021, Wookieepedia held a vote to ban deadnaming, which triggered debate within Star Wars fan circles around the naming of the non-binary artist Robin Pronovost's article on the site. In response to the situation, Fandom, the wiki hosting service which hosts Wookieepedia, terminated the voting process and updated its terms of use policy to prohibit deadnaming across its websites. On behalf of the Wookieepedia administration team, Fandom also permanently banned Darth Culator and Toprawa and Raltiir, two administrators respectively, citing a pattern of "bullying and intimidation". In addition, Wookieepedia's administration apologized to Pronovost for the duress that they endured as a result of the website's deadnaming vote.

== Reception ==
Actors in the Star Wars franchise have used Wookieepedia to have a better understanding of the Star Wars universe and to better portray their characters, including Felicity Jones who portrayed Jyn Erso in the 2016 film Rogue One: A Star Wars Story and Alden Ehrenreich who portrayed young Han Solo in the 2018 film Solo: A Star Wars Story.

== See also ==
- List of fan wikis
- List of online encyclopedias
- List of wikis
