= Ausir =

Ausir may refer to:

- Osiris, sometimes vocalised as "Ausir", an ancient Egyptian god
- Paweł Dembowski (born 1983), pseudonym "Ausir", Polish translator, publisher and political activist
