= Supernatural Wiki =

Wiki for American television series Supernatural

Supernatural Wiki aka SuperWiki
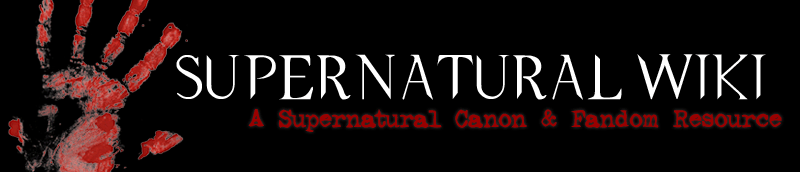

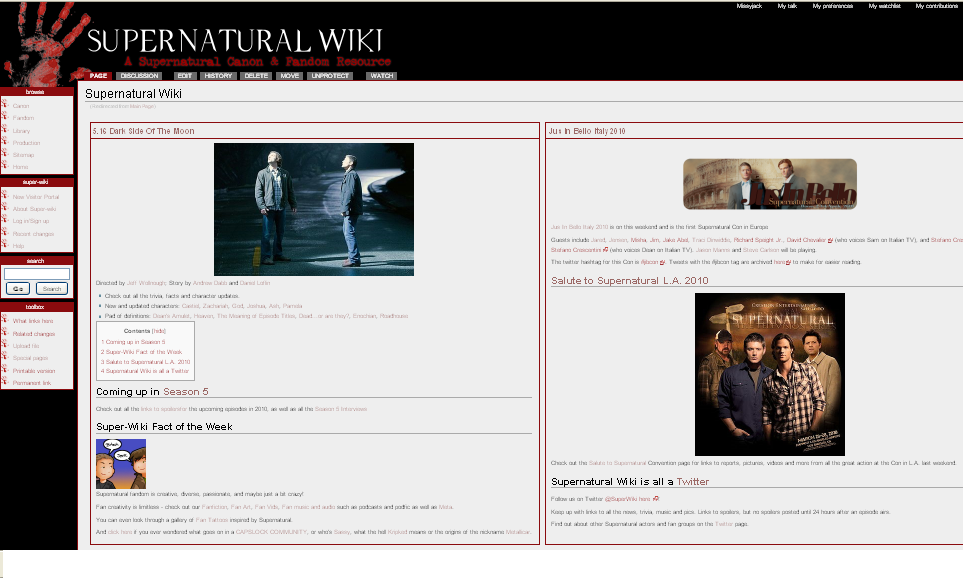
- Supernatural Wiki's main page
- Website type: Fan wiki Online encyclopedia
- Available in: English
- Creator: Jules Wilkinson
- Revenue: None
- Website: supernaturalwiki.com
- Commercial: No
- Registration: Optional (Note: Required for editing.)
- Launched: August 6, 2006
- Current status: Active

Supernatural Wiki, also known as SuperWiki, is a wiki-powered online encyclopedia for the CW's horror television series Supernatural, associated projects and events.

The site was launched on August 12, 2006, using MediaWiki software to maintain a user-created database of information. Supernatural Wiki and its domain, supernaturalwiki.com is hosted by a fan who accepts donations to hosting costs but makes no profit from running the site.

As of November 14, 2025, the site contained 4,705 articles.

== Overview ==
Supernatural Wiki was launched on August 12, 2006, following the first season of Supernatural. Originally managed by a collective of fans, since 2008 the administrator of the site has been Australian fan Jules Wilkinson. The site provides detailed episode synopses, character biographies, pop culture and music references, information on folklore and religion as well as information on the cast and crew. It also documents tie-in material including official novels, magazines, and associated web-material.

Unique amongst wiki sites for TV series, Supernatural Wiki also documents the show's Fandom. This includes creative works such as fan fiction including slash fiction, fan videos, fan art, fanzines and other fan-works. Fandom activities such as fan conventions – both fan-run and professional conventions attended by the cast and crew – are covered as well as are fan websites, media blogs and charity fund-raising. The history and culture of the Supernatural fandom is documented, including the Argot peculiar to this fandom.

Additionally the site conducts interviews with the production staff on the show and also runs events during conventions such as San Diego Comic-Con called "Wayward Cocktails" which bring the fans, cast and crew of the show together.

In 2019, there were 4.2 million visits to the site.

== Impact ==
Supernatural Wiki has been recognized by other media outlets as a source of information about the show and its fandom. The CW Source Blog said of the site: "They've collected and dissected nearly every aspect of the show, the behind-the-scenes world, and the fan community, and laid it out in stunning detail.". The SuperWiki has also been referenced by media critics such as the Chicago Tribune's Maureen Ryan for its coverage of conventions such as San Diego Comic-Con.

The site has become an information resource by writers, production staff and cast. Writer Robbie Thompson called it an "indispensable" resource. Star Jared Padalecki said "I'm on the show, and I'm on (Supernatural Wiki) more than once a week researching it."

The site was credited by author Keith R. A. DeCandido in the acknowledgments to his Supernatural tie-in novel Nevermore.

In February 2009, the site established a Twitter presence at @SuperWiki. As of 18 June 2021, the site has 108, 313 followers, including many of the cast and crew from Supernatural.

On 7 September 2009, in the lead up to the start of Season 5, @SuperWiki started ending tweets with the tag #luciferiscoming, and suggested fans do the same as a mischievous way to get attention for the show. The tag #luciferiscoming reached number 1 of the trending topics on Twitter. Rapper Sean Combs (@iamdiddy who has over a million followers) started a #Godishere tweet in retaliation, being unaware of the context of #luciferiscoming and assuming it was an anti-Christian movement. Twitter moved to stop posts with tags including both God and Lucifer from appearing in trending topics. Fans continued to use #supernatural and #inkripkewetrust, and both also reached high on the list of trending topics.

== Awards ==
In April 2011 the site won the SFX (magazine) Best Franchise Specific website award beating out chucktv.net, The One Ring, Leaky Cauldron, Life, Doctor Who And Combom, and WhoFix.

SFX Magazine described the site as "The most comprehensive Supernatural site on the web, established in 2006, Supernatural Wiki is a well laid-out, intelligently designed, easy to navigate Aladdin's cave of Winchester goodness."

In 2014, the site was a board nominated finalist in the Shorty Social Media Awards.

At the end of the 15th and final season of Supernatural, the site was awarded a special plaque by Warner Brothers Entertainment for the coverage and support of the show.

== See also ==
- List of fan wikis
- List of online encyclopedias
- List of wikis
