= Hubert Thieblot =

French businessman (born 1984)

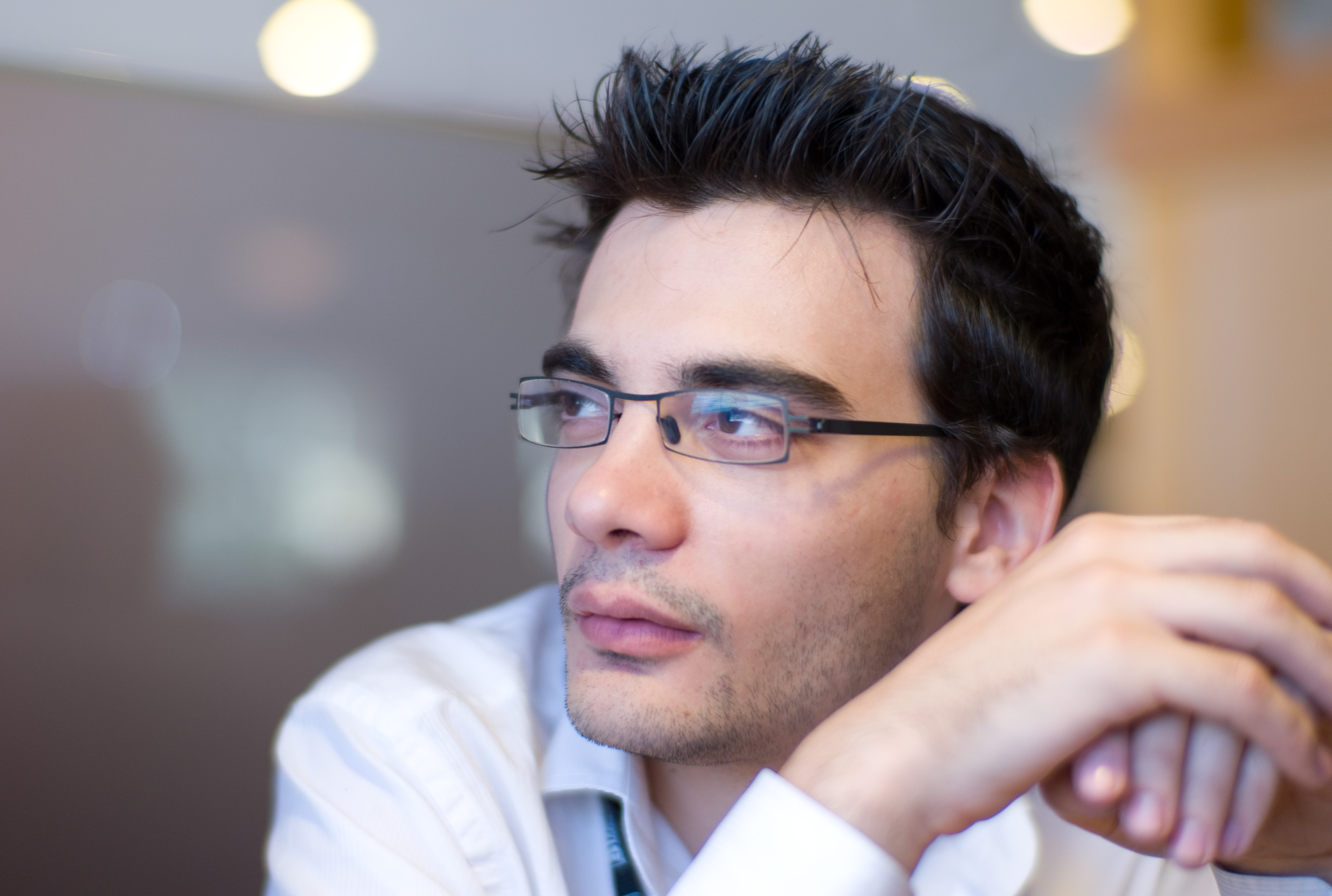
- Thieblot in 2008
- Born: 8 December 1984 (age 41); Paris, France
- Occupations: Businessman, entrepreneur
- Known for: Founder and CEO of Curse, Inc.; Vice President at Twitch

Hubert Thieblot (born 8 December 1984) is a French businessman and entrepreneur best known for founding Curse, Inc. in 2005 and serving as its chief executive officer (CEO) until January 2018. Under his leadership, Curse grew from a hobbyist World of Warcraft fan site into one of the largest gaming media networks on the internet, encompassing wikis, news, video content, and desktop applications including the Curse Client and Curse Voice. By 2013, the Curse network attracted in excess of 30 million unique visitors per month. In 2016, Twitch acquired Curse, and Thieblot subsequently joined Twitch, where he has served as Vice President of Emerging Markets and Mobile. He has spoken at various industry events, including the 2011 Montgomery Technology Conference and the Login 2011 Conference.

== Curse ==
As a teenager, Thieblot was a fan of World of Warcraft, a popular massively multiplayer online roleplaying game. His interest in the game led to him creating a website to organise and share World of Warcraft modifications, add-ons, and plugins to change player experience via the user interface. As traffic rose, Thieblot decided to turn his hobby into a business, dropping out of his Swiss information technology program to incorporate in 2006 as Curse, Inc. The name "Curse" derives from the name of his World of Warcraft guild (a collection of players), which at the time was one of the strongest guilds in Europe.

As the company began to increase in traffic and revenue, Thieblot hired his brother as the first Curse employee, and after relocating to Germany, hired a third developer to aid in the site development. During this time, the site grew both in traffic and in number of hosted modifications. In 2007, Thieblot began development on the Curse Client, a comprehensive solution to add-on management and distribution. As the client matured into beta status, its feature set became more comprehensive, supporting connections to various Curse modification databases. In 2008, with over 2/3rds of his traffic coming from the United States, Thieblot moved Curse to San Francisco and began to expand Curse into community sites, news, forums, databases, and original content.

After seeking venture capital financing in 2007 and 2009, Thieblot began to expand the services and scope of coverage provided by Curse. In 2010, Curse became a Microsoft Bizspark One company, and in 2011, Curse became an Inc. 500 company. Thieblot was invited to speak at the 2011 Montgomery Technology Conference and the Login 2011 Conference, and has since sponsored international roundtable discussions between industry leaders and top executives concerning challenges, successes, and the future of the video game industry. Since launching in 2006, Thieblot has overseen the expansion of Curse content and traffic, with viewership and revenue doubling each year. In April 2012, Ernst & Young named Thieblot as a semifinalist in their "Ernst & Young Entrepreneur of the Year" program for Northern California, recognizing his entrepreneurial efforts and successes with Curse.

Thieblot has overseen the expansion of Curse from wikis and community sites into the desktop application realm through several projects. Curse Client, a desktop application allowing for the unified browsing, installation, and management of plugins, was developed as a means to simplify the databases of game modifications first offered by Curse. The Client has expanded from World of Warcraft, Thieblot's initial inspiration for the Curse network, into several other titles, including Runes of Magic, World of Tanks, and Minecraft. In 2014, Thieblot announced the beta version of Curse Voice, a desktop Voice over IP (VOIP) application designed for games such as League of Legends, integrating voice chat and auto-match making with several titles.
