= The Unofficial Elder Scrolls Pages =

Elder Scrolls wiki

- Founded: 1995
- Predecessor: Daggerfall FAQ
- Founder: Dave Humphrey
- Website: en.uesp.net
- Advertising: No
- Commercial: No
- Current status: Live

The Unofficial Elder Scrolls Pages (commonly abbreviated UESP) is a fan wiki about The Elder Scrolls universe, including not only all official content, but a variety of unofficial and fan content as well. As of October 2026, the wiki has over 120,000 articles.

== History ==
In the fall of 1994, UESP originated as a message board on Usenet called "Daggerfall FAQ" and featured prerelease content about The Elder Scrolls II: Daggerfall. The Daggerfall FAQ then turned into a webpage in 1995, and a few months later it was renamed "The Unofficial Elder Scrolls Pages".

In 2005, soon before the release of The Elder Scrolls IV: Oblivion, the website switched to the wiki format, allowing users to edit pages. The same year, it moved to its own dedicated server based in Montreal.

In December 2023, UESP reached 100,000 articles.

In 2025, Bethesda asked a group of UESP editors to design a character for The Elder Scrolls VI. The users decided to create a memorial character for deceased forum member Loranna Pyrel.

== See also ==
- List of fan wikis
- List of online encyclopedias
