= Wiktor Bukato =

Polish translator (1949–2021)

Wiktor Cezary Bukato (25 February 1949–26 July 2021) was a Polish translator and publisher, specializing in fantasy. He was also a fandom activist, and an accredited translator of English and Russian.

== Education and career ==
Wiktor was a graduate of the College of Foreign Languages at the Institute of Applied Linguistics of the University of Warsaw.

In the mid 1970s he was an English teacher at XVII High School Andrzej Frycz Modrzewski in Warsaw; whilst also an employee of the English-language editorial office of Polskie Radio.

From the late 1970s, he was an activist of the National Polish Fans of Fantasy and Science Fiction Club (Ogólnopolski Klub Miłośników Fantastyki i Science Fiction) and then the SFan Fantasy Club. In 1982 he became a collaborator of the publishing house Wydawnictwo Iskry, where he created the Zeszytową Iskier series. From 1983-1990 he was an editor in Wydawnictwie Alfa, the creator of Biblioteki Fantastyki. Wiktor then became the head of the Warsaw branch of the publishing house Phantom Press (1991-1992), and then editor-in-chief of the publishing house Alkazar (1992-1995).

He was the chairman of the European Science Fiction Society and the coordinator of Eurocon 1991 in Kraków. Until 1990 he was also a member of the Science Fiction Writers of America.

He was the author of the Z ansibla column in Fenix and the memoir series Scenes from the Life of Dragons in ŚKF Monthly.

== Prizes and awards ==
- Three-time winner of Śląkfa in the Publisher of the Year category for the years 1985, 1986 and 1988
- Award of the European Science Fiction Association for the best publisher, (1990)
- The 'Karel' award (for the best translator) awarded in 1987 by World SF
