= Battlestar Wiki =

Fan-run online encyclopedia for the Battlestar Galactica franchise

- Website type: Wiki
- Available in: English, German, French
- Creator: Joe Beaudoin Jr.
- Website: battlestarwiki.org
- Commercial: No
- Registration: Optional
- Launched: 2005
- Current status: Active

Battlestar Wiki (also called the Battlestar Galactica Wiki) is a fan-run online encyclopedia and episode guide dedicated to covering the Battlestar Galactica science-fiction franchise. The wiki is built on MediaWiki software and hosted independently of Fandom. According to a 2022 study published in Transformative Works and Cultures, the site was Battlestar's largest fan-built information site, at more than 4,900 pages.

The site's contributor community and documentation practices have also been examined in the peer-reviewed journals WiderScreen and Flow.

== Content and scope ==
Battlestar Wiki organizes its coverage by series, with separate sections devoted to the original 1978–1979 series, Galactica 1980, the re-imagined 2003–2009 series, Caprica, and Blood & Chrome. Episode entries typically include broadcast information, plot summaries, cast and character listings, and analysis of continuity. The site also documents licensed tie-in material such as novels, comics, and companion books, along with behind-the-scenes and production information drawn from interviews, commentary tracks, and official podcasts.

The wiki maintains a policy that requires information to be drawn from aired or otherwise official sources rather than fan speculation. It operates an associated sister project, Battlestar WikiMedia, a repository for screen captures and other images. As of June 2026, the main English-language wiki listed 6,168 articles and roughly 259,000 cumulative edits from about 8,700 registered users, and the project also maintains active German- and French-language editions.

The site has also maintained a feature called "Official Communiques", through which contributors could submit production-related questions directly to the writers and crew of the re-imagined series. Bradley Thompson, a writer and (from the fourth season) a supervising producer on the re-imagined series, answered contributor questions on the page during 2006 and 2007, including confirming the surname of the character Cally and providing details on unreleased fourth-season episode titles.

== Reception and scholarly analysis ==
In a 2022 article in Transformative Works and Cultures, media scholars Chris Comerford and Natalie Krikowa examined Battlestar Wiki alongside the Star Trek wiki Memory Alpha and the Xena: Warrior Princess fan archive AUSXIP as examples of what they termed "archive-lensing", describing how long-running fan archives can act as a chronicle, a guide, and a catalyst for ongoing fan engagement with a franchise. The authors noted that Battlestar Wiki's own editing activity had slowed but that its volunteer team maintained the site's accompanying social media accounts on a near-daily basis.

Writing in the academic journal Flow in 2008, doctoral researcher Sarah Toton analyzed the demographics and editorial practices of Battlestar Wiki's contributor community, describing it as a group of more than 1,200 registered users that was, at the time, predominantly male. Toton argued that the wiki actively collected, organized, and interpreted fan knowledge of the series, pushing back on framings of wikis as neutral platforms for user-generated content. She also examined how the site's contributors negotiated the inclusion of material related to gender and sexuality within an "encyclopedic", fact-based framework.

A 2021 article in the Finnish peer-reviewed journal WiderScreen, by media researchers Aino-Kaisa Koistinen, Raine Koskimaa, and Tanja Välisalo, discussed Battlestar Wiki as part of a broader analysis of the franchise's "transmedia universe". The authors described the wiki's episode-by-episode documentation, including broadcast dates, plot synopses, and cast information, and argued that such fan-built archives influence how audiences engage with the non-narrative, supplementary material that surrounds a television franchise.

The site has also drawn brief notice outside academia. In 2008, the technology publication Network World acknowledged "the devoted Battlestar Galactica fans at Battlestar Wiki" in a humorous feature imagining a fictional sales pitch to the series' Commander Adama.

== See also ==
- List of fan wikis
- Fan labor
