= Śląski Klub Fantastyki =

Polish speculative fiction fandom club

- Abbreviation: ŚKF
- Predecessor: OKMFiSF
- Established: 1981; 45 years ago
- Founder: Piotr Kasprowski
- Founded at: University of Silesia in Katowice
- Legal status: OPP
- Headquarters: Koszutka
- Location: Katowice, Poland
- Region served: Silesia
- Members: 200 (2004)
- Award: Śląkfa
- Website: skf.org.pl

Śląski Klub Fantastyki (ŚKF, lit. Silesian Speculative Fiction Club, sometimes translated to English as Silesian Fantasy Club or Silesian Science-Fiction Club) is the oldest speculative fiction fandom club in Silesia, Poland. Founded in 1981 in Katowice, it has been the organizer of Polcon, largest of Polish science-fiction conventions, five times (1986, 1988, 1997, 2001 and 2010), the 2010 also being Eurocon, and yearly organizes the Seminarium Literackie con, as well as anime&manga Asucon. It also has its own award, the Śląkfa (awarded since 1984). It has over 200 members, several publications, and a library. Notable members include Piotr W. Cholewa, translator of English literature, and Jakub Ćwiek and Anna Kańtoch, writers. It is a Public Benefit Organization as defined by Polish law.

== See also ==
- Science fiction and fantasy in Poland
