= Lostpedia =

Lost wiki

- Screenshot Lostpedia's visitor homepage
- Website type: Fan wiki Online encyclopedia
- Available in: 15 languages
- Owner: Fandom
- Creators: Kevin Croy; Communal
- Revenue: Advertising
- Website: lostpedia.fandom.com/wiki/Main_Page
- Commercial: No
- Registration: Required for editing
- Launched: September 22, 2005; 21 years ago
- Current status: Active
- Content license: Creative Commons Attribution-NonCommercial-NoDerivs 2.5 Generic

Lostpedia is a wiki-powered online encyclopedia of information regarding the American television drama Lost. Launched on September 22, 2005, by Kevin Croy, the site uses MediaWiki software to maintain a user-created database of information. The site's content is under a Creative Commons license (by-nc-nd), which means that it is available free to the public, but cannot be used for commercial purposes and should not be modified by people who are not part of the community of the website. As of April 2019, the site contains an estimated 7,380 articles. On December 18, 2008, the site became a part of Wikia (now Fandom).

== History ==
Lostpedia was created by Kevin Croy in 2005, a programmer consultant, when he found that there was no Lost wiki. Croy registered the domain within 20 minutes, and the website grew quickly. Lostpedia provides detailed episode synopses, character biographies, cultural references and themes, as well as a range of other articles. The site's main page features an international episode airing schedule, recent news related to Lost, as well as a featured article of the week. The site includes information on the tie-ins associated with Lost, including Lost novels, the Lost Experience and other web content. Lostpedia lists Lost related websites, which includes official websites affiliated with the show and its producers, websites used in the Lost Experience, fan sites and other notable unofficial sites. It also lists and discusses notable hoax websites which are often misconstrued by fans of the show as official. Lostpedia added a discussion forum in July 2006, and an IRC channel in September 2006. In June 2008, Lostpedia began holding Q&As with members of the Lost cast and crew, including Michael Emerson, Jorge Garcia, Rebecca Mader, François Chau and David Fury. More recently Wikia is now the owner of the site. Since 2010, the wiki has included fair-use audio from Lost hosted through Assembla.

== Facts and speculation ==
The Lost series has a wandering cryptic storyline which spawns numerous unresolved questions. Encouraged by Lost's writers and stars, who often interact with fans online, viewers and TV critics alike have taken to rampant theorization in an attempt to unravel the mysteries. Spoilers and rumors about episodes that have not aired in North America were allowed for some time (with restrictions), until mid-2008 when all spoilers were banned from the wiki. In order to remain a reputable source, Lostpedia follows a "theory policy", which discriminates between canonical and non-canonical sources, and the various canonical sources are ranked to determine which supersedes which in the case of a contradiction. In each article, canonical facts are listed under a "Facts" heading, while speculation, provided it is logically consistent and not discredited or disproved, is listed under a "Theories" heading. Erroneous information is not permitted at all. From November 15, 2006, onwards, Lostpedia requires the theories to be on a separate sub-page.

== Role in The Lost Experience ==
As part of the alternate reality game The Lost Experience, which ran from April 24, 2006, to September 24, 2006, a series of images called "glyphs", were released on numerous websites and in physical locations in cities across the world. The glyphs, once entered into an in-game website, would unlock a short video clip. Lostpedia was chosen by the game producers to host the 42nd glyph. During the course of the game, Lostpedia was also mentioned on the official ABC show blog, as well as its UK and Australian equivalents. A "DJ Dan" podcast also quoted an article from Lostpedia. Additionally during the game, Lostpedia was continually updated by its users to include the latest game clues and solutions as they were found. In the aftermath of the game, Hi-ReS!, the company which designed all in-game websites for the Lost Experience, links to Lostpedia on its homepage as a detailed analysis of the franchise.

== Impact ==
Tom Lowry of Business Week called the site "a replica of online user-generated Wikipedia, that is dedicated solely to all things Lost." David Kushner of Rolling Stone called the site "the best example of how an online community can complement a series." Lostpedia topped Wired's list of best non-Wikipedia "pedias" in June 2008. In September 2006, Lostpedia received a comment (see ref) in the Stuttgart newspaper Stuttgarter Zeitung. In October 2006, Lostpedia was criticized for insufficiently crediting and providing copyright information on images. In response, the site began enforcing its policy to add copyright and licensing information for all images. Lostpedia was SciFi.com Site of the Week on July 5, 2006. Lostpedia was number three in Entertainment Weekly's 25 best fansites of 2007.

Lostpedia has set up sixteen sister projects for non-English language contributions in Arabic, Chinese, Danish, Dutch, French, German, Greek, Hebrew, Hungarian, Italian, Japanese, Korean, Polish, Portuguese, Russian and Spanish. The policy of not providing spoilers until an episode has aired extends to a few of these sister projects, and is based on local air dates rather than the North American air dates. This is not the case in English speaking countries (UK, Ireland, Australia in particular) where they share the main site with North America. There are however spoiler warnings. Toward the end of the series the UK, Irish and Australian audiences now saw episodes within a week of U.S. airing.

== See also ==
- List of online encyclopedias
- List of fan wikis
- List of wikis
