= Wookiee =

Fictional humanoid aliens from the Star Wars franchise

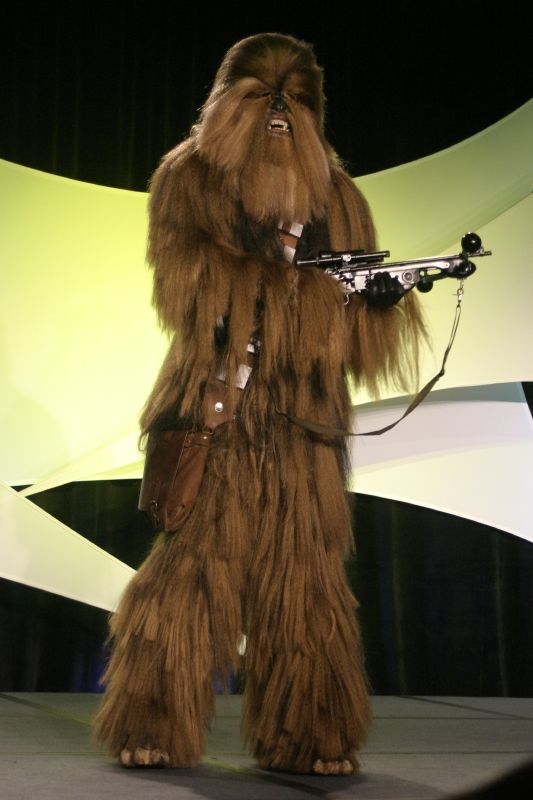
- Costume of Chewbacca, a Wookiee, at the 2007 Star Wars Celebration fan convention

In-universe information
- Home world: Kashyyyk
- Language: Shyriiwook

Wookiees (/ˈwʊkiːz/) are fictional humanoid aliens from the Star Wars franchise, originating from the forested planet Kashyyyk (/kəˈʃiːk/ kə-SHEEK). George Lucas, the creator of Star Wars, was inspired to design the Wookiee Chewbacca by his dog, conceiving a character who was large, furry, and intelligent. The suit used to portray Chewbacca was similar to earlier suits constructed for 2001: A Space Odyssey, with the facial features as the main difference. The character's vocalizations were created using animal sounds combined in a way that sound designer Ben Burtt felt conveyed emotion. Since the release of Star Wars, Chewbacca and other Wookiees have appeared in a range of films, series, video games, and comics.

Star Wars media establish a number of details about the fictional culture of the Wookiees, as well as their language, Shyriiwook. They are shown to have a rivalry with the Trandoshan species. Life Day is often shown as a major Wookiee holiday, first created for The Star Wars Holiday Special but since depicted and referenced elsewhere. Among the Wookiees that have appeared in Star Wars media are several Wookiee Jedi. The name of Wookieepedia, a Star Wars wiki, is a portmanteau of Wookiee and Wikipedia.

== Design ==
According to Star Wars creator George Lucas, his Alaskan Malamute named Indiana (who later became the namesake of the title character of Lucas's Indiana Jones movies), frequently sat by Lucas's side while he was writing or driving his car, which inspired him to give Han Solo a sidekick. He wanted this sidekick to be "like a big furry dog" but also intelligent. The character was named Chewbacca, from the Russian words чудовище (chudovishche, 'monster') and собака (sobaka, 'dog').

The name of Chewbacca's species comes from an ad-libbed line in George Lucas's THX 1138, where the actor Terry McGovern exclaims: "I think I ran over a Wookiee back there". Some sources link this word to the surname of a friend of McGovern's, whose full name is given variously as Ralph Wooky or Bill Wookey.

The suit worn by Chewbacca's actor, Peter Mayhew, in the original Star Wars film was designed by make-up artist Stuart Freeborn. He stated in a 1986 interview that the design was based on the costumes used for the apelike creatures in 2001: A Space Odyssey, with the main difference being Chewbacca's furry face. He said it was otherwise "exactly the same inside". According to a 1976 article by The New York Times, Mayhew was the only available actor tall enough for the costume, at over seven feet (2.1 m).

The design for the Wookiee's face was Lucas's idea, inspired by his own pets. He told Freeborn that he had a dog and a cat, and mentioned a doglike design. When Freeborn made a basic sculpture to demonstrate his idea, Lucas approved. However, Lucas later suggested a feline appearance instead, but he was again dissatisfied with the mock-up. He asked Freeborn to combine the two animals, leading to the final Wookiee design.

Ben Burtt, the sound designer of the Star Wars films, wanted to create a believable sound for Chewbacca given that the character did not have proper lips. This led him to consider bears, as they use the backs of their mouths to vocalize. Across various accounts, a four-month-old cinnamon bear, three other bears, a badger, a lion, a seal, and a walrus have been reported as sources of Chewbacca's voice. Burtt specifically recounted recording the moaning of a walrus from Marineland in California whose pool was being cleaned. After recording the audio, Burtt combined different sounds that he felt represented a specific emotional tone. Cutting them together, he said, created a "sense of speech" for Chewbacca.

== Appearances ==
=== Original trilogy ===
Chewbacca and the droids were identified as particularly memorable features of Star Wars and its sequel, The Empire Strikes Back, by Aljean Harmetz of The New York Times and Gene Siskel of the Chicago Tribune, respectively, in the months shortly following the films' releases. Mayhew reprised the role of Chewbacca in The Empire Strikes Back.

Mayhew again returned as Chewbacca in Return of the Jedi. Parts of the film were shot at Grizzly Creek Redwoods State Park in Northern California and there was concern that Mayhew would be mistaken for Bigfoot and potentially shot if he wandered off in costume. He was given strict instructions to stay close to camp at all times. In the end, filming concluded without incident.

The final battle of Return of the Jedi was based on a scrapped concept from the first Star Wars film, which had originally involved Wookiees. Lucas envisioned a battle between the Empire and a "society of Wookiees" at the end of the movie, but this proved too complicated, and Chewbacca ended up being the movie's only Wookiee. When Return of the Jedi was being made, Lucas wanted to create the battle he had originally envisioned, but he no longer felt that Wookiees were an appropriate choice: Chewbacca's character made Lucas's initial conception of Wookiees as having a primitive culture seem inaccurate. Instead, a new species was created: the Ewoks. Lucas designed them to be the opposite of Wookiees: short instead of tall and short-haired instead of long-haired. Monica Zurowsky of the Calgary Herald wrote that Lucas said he created the name by flipping the syllables of Wookiee and rhyming it with the name of the Native American Miwok tribe.

=== Star Wars Holiday Special ===
The Star Wars Holiday Special takes place on the Wookiee planet of Kashyyyk. The film centers around Han Solo trying to help Chewbacca, again portrayed by Mayhew, return home in time for Life Day. Life Day was originally conceived as a galactic celebration, but the plot was simplified so that Life Day was instead a sacred Wookiee holiday. The film's first 10–15 minutes follow Chewbacca's family as they prepare for the holiday, conversing in unsubtitled grunts. This scene was likened by Chris Williams, writing for Collider, to "stumbling into a surreal, laugh-track-less sitcom in a language no one understands". He called the special itself a "perfectly terrible object" and wrote that other than Chewbacca, "none of the Wookiee costumes would pass muster at a local theme park". Another journalist criticized a scene where one of the Wookiees watches pornography. ABC News states that the special was "such a flop that it was never again broadcast on TV or released on video".

=== Knights of the Old Republic ===
Star Wars: Knights of the Old Republic, a video game set thousands of years before the events of Star Wars and its prequels and sequels, features multiple Wookiee characters (including Zaalbar, a member of the player's party) and the planet Kashyyyk. The planet is shown to be under the control of the Czerka Corporation, who capture and enslave Wookiees with the support of local chieftains. The player is given the option to end the slave trade or help support it. J. Brodie Shirey, writing for Screen Rant, credited the design of Kashyyyk in Knights of the Old Republic for influencing the planet's portrayal in later Star Wars video games.

=== Revenge of the Sith ===
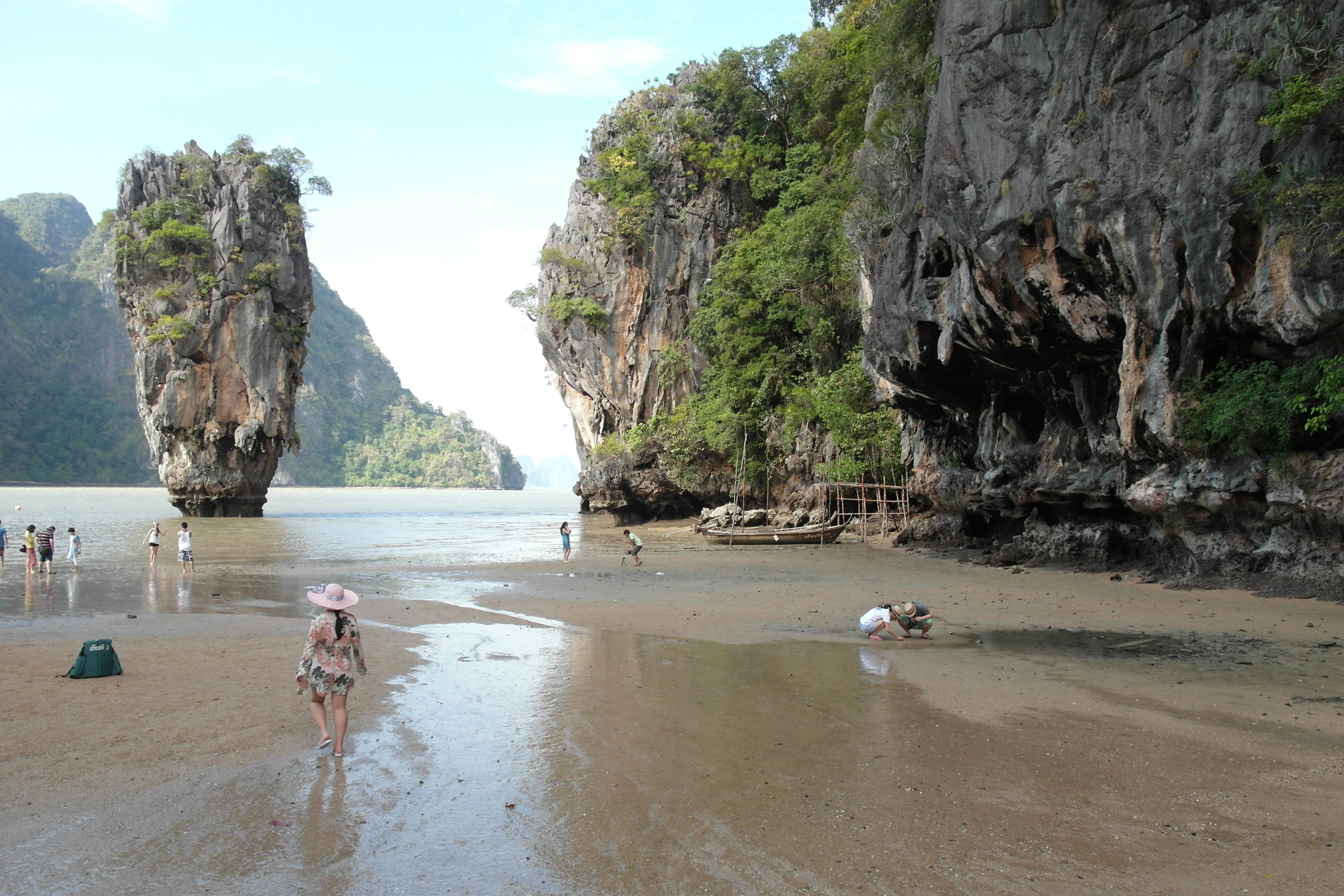
Phang Nga Bay in Thailand, shots of which appeared as Kashyyyk in Revenge of the Sith

Star Wars: Episode III – Revenge of the Sith features a battle sequence set on Kashyyyk toward the end of the Clone Wars. Yoda is sent to aid the Wookiees owing to his "good relations" with them. Shots used for the arrival scene on Kashyyyk were filmed during postproduction at Thailand's Phang Nga Bay near Phuket, and some were digitally combined with places in Guilin, China. Supervisor Dave Elsey said that numerous Wookiee costumes used for the battle were "basically being built the same as the original Chewie". Mayhew once again returned for Chewbacca's brief appearance in the film. Some of the details of the Kashyyyk scenes come from The Star Wars Holiday Special, including terrain, foliage, and treetop structures resembling Chewbacca's home as depicted in the special. The voice of Attichitcuk, Chewbacca's father, was reused from archival Holiday Special dialogue for Tarfful, a friend of Chewbacca and Yoda.

=== Sequel trilogy ===
Chewbacca appeared in all three films of the Star Wars sequel trilogy. He was again portrayed by Mayhew in Star Wars: The Force Awakens. According to Mayhew's family, the actor "fought his way back from being wheelchair-bound" in order to play the character. Though Mayhew did not have an acting role in Star Wars: The Last Jedi, he helped instruct Chewbacca's new actor, Joonas Suotamo, on playing the part. Suotamo played Chewbacca again in Star Wars: The Rise of Skywalker, the last film of the series known as the Skywalker Saga.

=== Solo ===
Suotamo also played Chewbacca in the standalone film Solo: A Star Wars Story, released less than six months after The Last Jedi and before The Rise of Skywalker. According to Screen Rant writer Chris Agar, the movie marks the first time that the Empire's mistreatment of Wookiees was shown in film; Chewbacca's first appearance in Solo is as a malnourished prisoner. Later in the film, he helps free other Wookiees from the mines of Kessel. The book The Art of Solo: A Star Wars Story includes an unused screenplay draft featuring Wookiee Stormtroopers. The idea was that this would allow for more development of the species without having to create individual faces.

=== The Book of Boba Fett ===
Krrsantan, a Wookiee bounty hunter who first appeared in various series of comics, was introduced as a live-action character in The Book of Boba Fett (a spinoff of The Mandalorian). Although the relationship between the Wookiee and Boba Fett depicted in the comics was not explicitly acknowledged, the IGN writer Jesse Schedeen interpreted some of the scenes as indirect references. Angie Mayhew, Peter Mayhew's widow, welcomed the performance of Krrsantan's actor, Carey Jones, stating that "Peter would have loved seeing a Wookiee truly unleashed!" Jones, a longtime Star Wars fan, described seeing himself in the Wookiee costume as "surreal".

=== Other media ===
Additional appearances of Wookiees in Star Wars media include Star Wars: Episode I – The Phantom Menace, Star Wars: The Clone Wars, Star Wars Rebels, Star Wars: The Bad Batch, and Star Wars: The Acolyte. The Battle of Kashyyyk from Revenge of the Sith is featured in Star Wars Battlefront II (as what one PC Gamer reviewer called a "bizarro version") and Star Wars Jedi: Fallen Order is partially set on the planet, revolving around the protagonist's efforts to shut down an Imperial refinery that has led to the enslavement of many Wookiees. In a critical review of Fallen Order by Sam White of GQ, Kashyyyk was described as the best looking planet of the three White had seen, but the appearance of the Wookiees was called "abysmal".

== Fictional culture ==
The Star Wars Databank describes Wookiees as gentle and intelligent creatures with short tempers. Their fictional home planet, Kashyyyk, is covered in dense forest, with oceans and swamps also present. The Star Wars Databank states that the Wookiees build their homes in the planet's trees and that their architecture incorporates advanced technology. They are depicted as having a historic feud with another species, the Trandoshans, which are giant humanoid reptiles that originate from the same planetary system. References to this feud appear in the Star Wars: The Clone Wars episode "Padawan Lost", where a Trandoshan hunting lodge is shown adorned with Wookiee pelts, and the game Star Wars: The Force Unleashed, where killing 200 Wookiees in the prologue level on Kashyyyk will earn the player the "Bossk" achievement (Bossk being a Trandoshan bounty hunter).

The Wookiee language is called Shyriiwook. Wookiees are seldom depicted speaking Galactic Basic (the in-universe name for the English language in Star Wars), although the Wookiee Ralrracheen is able to converse with Princess Leia in Basic in the Star Wars: Heir to the Empire novels. The character explains that he suffers from a speech impediment that allows him to speak the language, while most Wookiees cannot. Conversely, the film Solo has a scene where Han Solo talks to Chewbacca in Shyriiwook. Solo's actor, Alden Ehrenreich, said that the noises he made were mostly improvised, aside from a phrase that needed to be repeated (Shyriiwook is not a constructed language), while Suotamo's dialogue was dubbed with animal sounds. In their book The Ultimate Star Wars and Philosophy: You Must Unlearn What You Have Learned Jason T. Eberl and Kevin S. Decker analyze whether Shyriiwook, specifically its usage by Chewbacca, can be accurately described as a language from a philosophical standpoint, even though it is readily interpreted by viewers as such. The authors argue that the unintelligibly of the noises, the impossibility of identifying it as speech without dialogue from other characters, and the unscripted nature of the noises make the conclusion that Chewbacca does not actually speak "so obvious as to be unnecessary".

Life Day is depicted as a sacred Wookiee holiday. In one version of the holiday, based on interviews with George Lucas compiled in the 1970s by Carol Wikarska Titelman, Lucasfilm's director of publishing, Life Day was said to have originally taken the form of a communal hallucinogenic experience invoked by consuming a specific root. She wrote that some Wookiee families continued to use that, but because of the unpleasant side effects, many others use a device called the environmental transporter instead. This device appeared in The Star Wars Holiday Special, albeit simplified from its original depiction for budget reasons. Life Day has since received appearances and mentions in Star Wars video games and other media, and a commemorative event was held at Disney's Star Wars: Galaxy's Edge in California and Florida on 17 November 2022 (the 44-year anniversary of The Star Wars Holiday Special).

During the production of Revenge of the Sith, George Lucas was against the idea of introducing a Wookiee Jedi, something he said should never be added to Star Wars (although some had already appeared in the Expanded Universe by that point). Lucas did not clearly explain this opinion, but he eventually allowed the introduction of a young Wookiee Jedi named Gungi to season five of The Clone Wars. As of 2024, a Screen Rant article records a total of six Wookiee Jedi in Star Wars Legends and four in Disney's canon. Among them is Kelnacca, introduced in The Acolyte, who became the first live-action Wookiee Jedi. Kelnacca was played by Joonas Suotamo, who has also portrayed Chewbacca.

Loyalty is shown to be an important aspect of Wookiee culture. In Knights of the Old Republic, the player's actions can trigger Mission, one of the party members, to leave the player and call on the Wookiee Zaalbar to join her. As Zaalbar has sworn a life debt to the player, he is unable to do so. However, he will refuse to kill her unless compelled to under the influence of the Force. Wookiees are shown to view the use of claws in combat as dishonorable across multiple works; Zaalbar is said to have been banished from Kashyyyk for accidentally using his claws to strike his brother, while The Acolyte shows Kelnacca going into exile after attacking other Jedi with his claws while under the control of a group of witches.

In the first Star Wars movie, Han Solo and Luke Skywalker receive medals following the destruction of the Death Star, while Chewbacca does not (although he does in an earlier version of the script and in the film's novelization). Soon after the release of Star Wars, Lucas said that Wookiees do not place much value in medals and that Chewbacca had a celebration with his own people where he received a prize, which Lucas called an honor for "the entire Wookiee race". Comics from before and after Disney's acquisition of Star Wars, as well as The Rise of Skywalker, have since provided varying interpretations of Chewbacca receiving a medal at some point after the award ceremony scene.

The 2003 game Star Wars Galaxies allowed players to form communities and construct buildings, including museums. One such museum, created by librarian and museum scholar Annie Platoff, was called the Wookiee Cultural Center (WCC). She spent four years collecting in-game objects related to the Wookiees and Kashyyyk for the WCC, which expanded from its original location into a network of six museums total, including a traveling one. She sought to apply professional standards to the management of the museum's collection, such as by crediting donors (amounting to over 300, including individual characters, guilds, and cities), creating labels for items based on theme, and assigning the items to appropriate places within the museum. She wrote that it could take hours of gameplay to construct one exhibit. The purpose of the study was to determine whether a virtual museum could become "real".

== Cultural impact ==
Wookieepedia is a volunteer-maintained Star Wars wiki hosted by Fandom. The website's self-description states that the name is a portmanteau of Wookiee and Wikipedia, but it clarifies that it has no affiliation with Wikipedia or the Wikimedia Foundation. Wookieepedia was established in 2005 by Steve Greenwood, a Wikipedia editor, and other Star Wars enthusiasts as a fan-maintained reference work. Greenwood contrasted its detailed coverage of the Star Wars Expanded Universe with Wikipedia's more general level of information.

Following the Afghan War documents leak, Twitter user Greg "Storm" DiCostanzo was inspired to create the hashtag #WookieeLeaks, which he described as a "Twitter game" to introduce "naughty details" about Star Wars. The hashtag received over 100,000 responses. Topics of the tweets include the claim that Chewbacca used mind-altering drugs on Endor, "Han shot first", and the implication that C-3PO was discharged from the Rebel Alliance military for violating "don't ask, don't tell". Contrary to a claim made by the title character of the series Peacemaker in the show's third episode, Wookiees do not canonically have teeth on their anuses. Peacemaker director James Gunn shared a screenshot with the trending Google search "do wookies [sic] have teeth on their buttholes" and credited Peacemaker for "influencing the cultural conversation". Screen Rant writer Kevin Erdmann suggested that Peacemaker may have confused Wookiees with the Verkle, a creature used by the Ewoks as bait in Return of the Jedi, which consists of the back half of a taxidermied deer with added teeth.

== See also ==
- Cultural impact of Star Wars
- Universe of Star Wars
