= Śląkfa =

- Awarded for: Award for Science Fiction and Fantasy Creators, Publishers, and Fans in Poland
- Country: Poland
- Presented by: Śląski Klub Fantastyki
- First award: 1983; 43 years ago
- Website: www.skf.org.pl

Śląkfa is the oldest Polish science fiction and fantasy award, although less known than the Janusz A. Zajdel Award. It is awarded by the Silesian Fantasy Club (Śląski Klub Fantastyki), the oldest of still-active Polish fandom organizations. The award was first presented in 1983. It is awarded in three categories: Creator of the Year, Publisher of the Year and Fan of the Year.

== Winners ==
	Creator of the year	Publisher of the year	Fan of the year
1983	Juliusz Machulski	Jacek Rodek	Not presented
1984	Janusz A. Zajdel	Jerzy Łuczak	Rafał Surmacz
1985	Marek Baraniecki	Wiktor Bukato	Robert Szmidt
1986	Not presented	Wiktor Bukato	Janusz Rumak
1987	Stanisław Lem	Mirosław Kowalski	Krzysztof Papierkowski
1988	Edmund Wnuk-Lipiński	Wiktor Bukato	Not presented
1989	Andrzej Sapkowski	Lech Jęczmyk	Wacław Kozubscy, Grzegorz Kozubscy
1990	Rafał A. Ziemkiewicz	Zbigniew Foniok	Wojciech Sedeńko
1991	Piotr W. Cholewa	Tomasz Kołodziejczak, Dariusz Zientalak jr.	Not presented
1992	Andrzej Sapkowski	Jacek Foromański	Anna Papierkowska
1993	Feliks W. Kres	Tadeusz Zysk	Not presented
1994	Eugeniusz Dębski	Jacek Rodek	Not presented
1995	Not presented	Mirosław Kowalski	Tomasz Kołodziejczak
1996	Marek S. Huberath	Dorota Malinowska	Kazimierz Kielarski
1997	Ewa Białołęcka	Andrzej Miszkurka	Zbigniew Żygadło
1998	Rafał A. Ziemkiewicz	Zbigniew Foniok	Stanisław Strelnik
1999	Marek S. Huberath	Mirosław Kowalski	Witold Siekierzyński
2000	Jacek Dukaj	Marcin Iwiński	Marcin Grygiel
2001	Feliks W. Kres	Andrzej Miszkurka	Sylwia Żabińska
2002	Tomasz Bagiński	Tomasz Kołodziejczak	Ryszard Derdziński, Tomasz Gubała
2003	Wit Szostak	Anna Brzezińska, Edyta Szulc	Szymon Sokół
2004	Wit Szostak	Anita Kasperek	Artur Długosz, Konrad R. Wągrowski
2005	Jarosław Grzędowicz	Stanisław Rosiek	Joanna Słupek
2006	Maja Lidia Kossakowska	Andrzej Miszkurka	Jarosław Florczak
2007	Jacek Dukaj	CD Projekt	Witold Siekierzyński, Andrzej Lechowicz, Wawrzyniec Bakalarski, Paweł Potakowskiego
2008	Tomasz Minkiewicz, Bartosz Minkiewicz	Wojciech Orliński	Waldemar Gruszczyński, Mamert Janion
2009	Jacek Dukaj, Jakub Jabłoński	Michał Stachyra, Maciej Zasowski	Paweł Dembowski
2010	Wit Szostak	Rafał Kosik, Katarzyna Sienkiewicz-Kosik	Adam Santorski
2011	Jakub Małecki	Adam Badowski	Konrad Wągrowski, Magazyn Esensja
2012	Ireneusz Konior	Marcin Beme	Daniel Krejt’ Zalewski
2013	Andrzej Sapkowski	Paweł Dembowski, Michał Michalski, Tomasz Stachewicz	Piotr Derkacz
2014	Aleksander Tukaj, Mikołaj Wicher	Ignacy Trzewiczek	Wojciech Rzadek
2015	Darek Kocurek	Dastin Wawrzyniak	Andrzej Zimniak
