= Tolkien Gateway =

J. R. R. Tolkien fan wiki

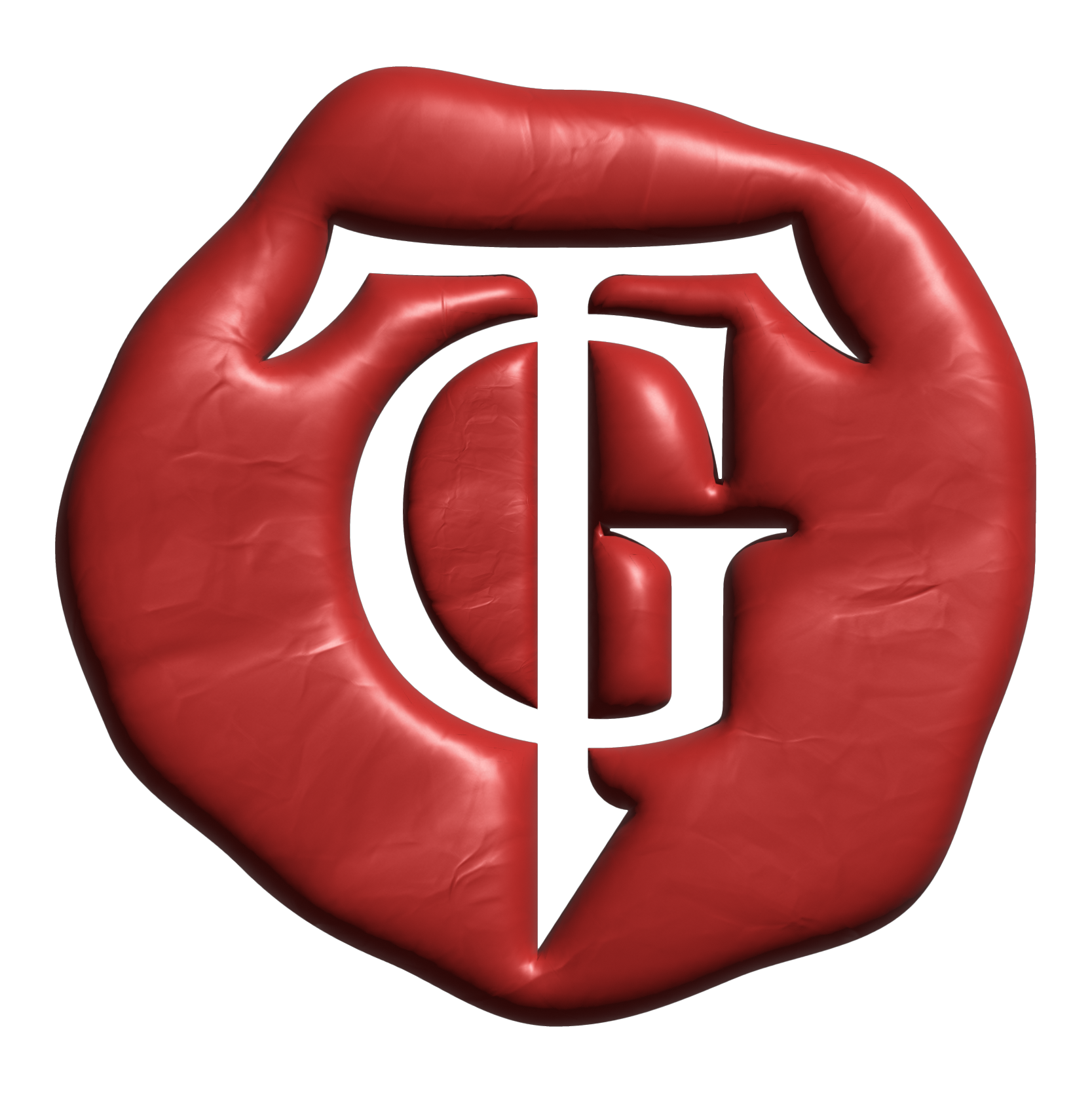

- Detail of Tolkien Gateway's front page, showing its organisation and coverage of topics such as books, characters, games, images, and music
- Website type: Fan wiki Online encyclopedia
- Available in: English
- Country of origin: United States
- Website: tolkiengateway.net tolkien.wiki
- Advertising: No
- Commercial: No
- Registration: Optional
- Launched: January 1, 2003; 23 years ago
- Current status: Active
- Content license: CC BY-SA 4.0

The Tolkien Gateway is a fan wiki that documents J. R. R. Tolkien's fantasy world of Middle-earth. It is respected and used by scholars. In 2023, it won a Tolkien Society Award. A Companion to J. R. R. Tolkien described it as "essential".

== Website ==
=== Coverage ===
The Tolkien Gateway is a fan wiki that documents all the characters, places, objects, and events in J. R. R. Tolkien's fantasy world of Middle-earth, with citations to Tolkien's texts. It provides some coverage of related non-Tolkien items such as films, actors, games, music, images, and scholarly books. It has interviewed Tolkien scholars such as John D. Rateliff. As of June 2025, the site had 12,952 content pages and 15,364 uploaded files.

=== Scholarly recognition ===
The site is described in Stuart D. Lee's 2014 scholarly handbook A Companion to J. R. R. Tolkien as "the main source to start a review of the plethora of Tolkien-based online materials." It is referenced in scholarly works such as VII, Journal of Tolkien Research, and Social Science Computer Review.

== Awards and distinctions ==
In 2023, Tolkien Gateway won a Tolkien Society Award for online content.

Tolkien Gateway is one of the four websites described as "essential" in A Companion to J. R. R. Tolkien. (Note: The four websites are the Tolkien Gateway, TheOneRing.net, the Tolkien Library (which is mainly a book site, but also runs articles, reviews, and news), and The Tolkien Society (which is an educational charity and literary society).)
