= Overwolf =

Software platform for developers of video game design

- Native name: אוברוולף בע"מ
- Type: Private
- Industry: Software; Video games
- Founded: September 29, 2009; 17 years ago in Israel
- Founders: Uri Marchand; Gil Or; Alon Rabinovitz; Nir Finkelstein
- Headquarters: Ramat Gan, Israel
- Area served: Worldwide
- Key people: Uri Marchand (CEO),
- Products: Overwolf platform; CurseForge; Tebex; Nitro
- Services: In-game app and mod distribution, monetization
- Website: www.overwolf.com

Overwolf is a software company, operating in domains of in-game application development, mod distribution and studio integration, game payment and monetization infrastructure, in-game and web advertising, and gameplay capture and sharing. Founded in 2009, the company has offices in Tel Aviv, New York, Los Angeles, London, and Seoul. As of 2025, Overwolf's network supports more than 5,000 games, and reaches approximately 113 million monthly active users, through a community of 184,000 in-game creators.

Overwolf is an operating system for community-driven games, aimed to establish public in-game app and mod creation for developers. The company paid creators $300 million in 2025, with payments increasing each year since its launch.

== History ==
Overwolf was founded in September 2009 by Uri Marchand, Gil Or, Alon Rabinowitz, and Nir Finkelstein, with a seed investment from Joseph (Yossi) Vardi. The company opened its software development kit in September 2012, allowing third-party developers to build overlay applications for PC games.

Overwolf raised multiple funding rounds. In September 2013 it raised a $5.3 million Series A, in November 2018 a $16 million Series B, in March 2021 a $52.5 million Series C and in November 2021 a $75 million Series D. Across all funding periods, the company has raised approximately $149 million of investments in total.

In June 2020, Overwolf acquired CurseForge, a mod-hosting platform, from Twitch.

In November 2021, it acquired MCPEDL, a content platform for Minecraft: Bedrock Edition.

In March 2022, Overwolf acquired Tebex, a platform for monetizing private game servers used with titles such as Minecraft, Rust, and ARK: Survival Evolved, for $29 million.

In May 2024, the company acquired Nitro (formerly NitroPay), a gaming-focused advertising technology firm in an eight-figure deal.

In 2026, Overwolf had paid more than $400 million to creators, a 33% increase from 2025, bringing its cumulative creator payouts to over $1.2 billion.

== Platform and products ==
Overwolf's core offering is an SDK (software development kit) and overlay framework, that lets developers build in-game and desktop applications for PC games, including titles such as League of Legends, Valorant, Fortnite, Call of Duty: Warzone, Counter-Strike 2, and PUBG. In 2022 analytics platform Mobalytics partnered with Overwolf to integrate its player-improvement tools into Overwolf's overlay platform.

=== CurseForge ===
CurseForge is a mod and add-on platform for games including World of Warcraft, Minecraft, The Sims 4, and ARK Survival Ascended. The platform hosts more than 500,000 mods and has recorded over 100 billion cumulative downloads, with 134,000 mod authors.

=== CurseForge for Studios ===
CurseForge for Studios is a full-service platform for integrating user-generated content into game titles, combining creator recruitment, cross-platform mod delivery, content moderation, and monetization tools. Its technology supports Unreal Engine and Unity through plugins, a custom SDK for proprietary engines, and certified delivery to PlayStation, Xbox, and Nintendo Switch.

=== Tebex ===
Tebex is a Merchant of Record monetization platform for game studios and server owners, handling payment processing, tax compliance, and dispute resolution for user-generated content sales. Its Checkout product offers three-day creator payouts across more than 100 payment methods and has processed over $1.5 billion to date. On the server side, Tebex powers item shops and subscriptions for titles including Minecraft and ARK.

=== Overwolf Ads ===
Overwolf Ads is an in-game and gaming-adjacent advertising business, offering standard display and video ad formats, custom placements such as branded takeovers, and gamified activations, including sponsored challenges and tournaments. Its clients include Universal Pictures, Nissan, Dentsu, and Havas. In April 2026, Overwolf Ads launched Gamer Grid, an audience-data product built from PC gameplay behavior, hardware signals, and content consumption. Gamer Grid is intended to help advertisers target gamers with more precision than traditional demographic data. In September 2026, Overwolf Ads launched ‘In-Game Audience Map,’ a product for brands to identify what their customers play across more than 5,000 video games. The business also includes Nitro, an ad monetization, founded in 2017, platform for gaming and community websites.

=== Outplayed ===
Outplayed is a free application that automatically captures gameplay highlights and lets users share clips directly to TikTok, Discord, YouTube, and Reddit. The app detects supported in-game events in real time (kills, deaths, and assists) and automatically creates clips for the event types a user selects; recordings are stored locally on the user's computer. Outplayed works regardless of graphics card or game launcher, unlike Steam's built-in recording feature, and includes in-app video editor for reviewing and trimming clips before sharing. In 2026, the app's in-product game list shows support for more than 7,000 titles.

Overwolf applies a "creator economy" model, in which developers and modders earn revenue through in-app advertising, subscriptions, and server monetization.

By 2025, creator payouts totaled over $800 million, including $240 million in 2024 and $300 million in 2025. Advertising revenue increased from $50 million in 2023 to $100 million in 2024. Additionally, Overwolf reported a 385% growth in European revenue following its expansion into the EU market in 2024.

== Reception ==
2022

- "Most Innovative Companies in Gaming", Fast Company
- "Best In-Game Advertising Platform", MarTech Breakthrough Awards

2024

- “Best Esports/Gaming Ad Technology,” Digiday Technology Awards
- 4th most visited gaming property in the US, Comscore

2025

- “To Ad Tech Company” & “Best Gaming Platform”, ADWEEK Tech Stack Awards

2026

- “Best Gaming Platform”, Campaign Media Company

== Community and charitable initiatives ==
Overwolf has organized community fundraising campaigns through third-party donation platforms, including a 2022 campaign supporting Ukraine relief efforts via Tiltify, which matched donations up to $10,000 for Direct Relief.
