= Heroes Wiki =

Former wiki

- Heroes Wiki's main page
- Website type: TV series fan wiki
- Available in: 10 languages
- Creator: Communal
- Revenue: Advertising
- Website: http://heroeswiki.com
- Commercial: No
- Registration: Required for editing
- Launched: October 10, 2006
- Current status: Defunct

Heroes Wiki was a fan wiki for NBC's science fiction drama Heroes. The site used MediaWiki software and launched on October 10, 2006. Heroes Wiki was supported by revenue from advertising, part of which was donated to various charities. As of June 28, 2010, the site contained over 5,500 articles created and edited by approximately 9,400 registered users, with over 157 million page views.

On October 18, 2008, Heroes Wiki announced that it had officially partnered with NBC. NBC now directs those interested in a wiki on Heroes to Heroes Wiki, and directly funds the site in exchange for on-site advertisements. The site was closed on June 1, 2020, due to low traffic rendering it unsustainable, but an archived copy has been made available online.

== Overview ==
Heroes Wiki was launched on October 10, 2006, several weeks after Heroes premiered in North America. Content includes articles on episodes, characters, cast and crew, cultural references, along with interviews with members of the Heroes cast and crew. Episode spoilers and user-contributed theories was permitted on certain areas within the wiki. The site's main page featured upcoming Heroes events and news, and links to articles summarizing the latest Heroes episode and online content. There are also links to Heroes-related websites, including official websites affiliated with the show and its producers, websites used in Heroes Evolutions, and unofficial fan sites. On September 18, 2008, the site became WAP-enabled for cell phones and other mobile devices.

The site also established nine projects containing translations of the main English language version of the wiki: Dutch, French, German, Hebrew, Italian, Portuguese, Spanish, Swedish, and Turkish.

When Heroes Wiki began its partnership with NBC in October 2008, links were added pointing to Heroes Wiki on NBC's Heroes and Heroes Evolutions sites. NBC also discontinued promoting its own wiki for Heroes, instead redirecting readers to Heroes Wiki through links at the top of related pages. In December 2008, the wiki was also referenced in several segments of NBC's Heroes Insider Interactive SMS, which uses text messaging to send facts, pose trivia questions, and conduct polling during the airing of episodes of the show.

== Role in Heroes Evolutions ==
As part of the alternate reality game in Heroes Evolutions, a mysterious Heroes character known only as Dropper Evs Dropper answered a number of fan-submitted questions posed by e-mail by Heroes Wiki administrator Gibson Stewart Ryan Gibson Stewart. The interview was posted at Heroes Wiki on July 24, 2008.

== Reception ==
Beyond its partnership with NBC, Heroes Wiki had been recognized by other media outlets, including New York Magazine, the New York Times, and E! Online. Washington Times writer Joseph Szadkowski notes that the site is "obviously created by some very hard-core fans." He describes Heroes Wiki as a "dense online encyclopedia [that] offers more than 1,600 entries on the show's mythology."

Content about Heroes cast and crew members had also been referenced elsewhere, including interviews with actor Kyson Lee James Kyson Lee (Comic Book Resources), senior producer Tolerico Joe Tolerico (BuddyTV), and the team behind the "Root and Branch" graphic novels (Comic Book Resources).

== See also ==
- List of multilingual MediaWiki sites
- List of fan wikis
- List of online encyclopedias
- List of wikis
