= Paweł Dembowski =

Polish translator, activist

- Born: 23 April 1983 (age 43); Głogów, Legnica Voivodeship, Polish People's Republic
- Occupations: Translator, Publisher
- Movement: New Left
- Awards: Śląkfa

Academic background
- Education: University of Wrocław (Licencjat, Magister)
- Thesis: English translations of Stanisław Lem's Solaris in the context of cultural power imbalance (2016)
- Political party: Razem
- Website: Paweł Ausir Dembowski on Bluesky

Paweł Dembowski (pseudonym "Ausir") (born April 23, 1983 in Głogów) is a Polish translator, publisher, political activist, and two-time winner of Śląkfa.

== Biography ==
Dembowski lives in Wrocław, where he graduated in English studies at the Faculty of Philology of the University of Wroclaw. His master's thesis concerned the English translations of the novel Solaris by Stanisław Lem. He has translated works by Ian Watson, Robert Shearman, Ken Liu, William H. Keith Jr., Evan Currie, Kelly Robson, Naomi Novik, Greg van Eekhout, Agnieszka Dale, Matthew Mather, and Ann Druyan as well as various computer games and films.

Dembowski is the founder of The Vault, a wiki dedicated to the Fallout series of video games, launched in 2005. He was the winner of the 2009 Śląkfa Award (the oldest science fiction award in Poland) in the Fan of the Year category. He was one of the founders of BookRage, a Polish e-book publishing company, for which he was awarded a second Śląkfa Award in the Publisher of the Year category in 2013.

Dembowski had been a member of the Razem political party since its founding in 2015 till August 2018. He ran in the 2015 parliamentary election in Poland as one of the party's candidates in Wrocław. Between May 2016 and June 2017, he was a member of the party's audit committee. In 2017, he was a member of the party's National Council, and the same year was elected to the Vratislavian council of Szczepin. However, he left the party in August 2018.
