= Agnieszka Dale =

Polish-born, London-based writer

Agnieszka Dale (née Surażyńska), is a Polish-born, London-based writer. Her first book, Fox Season and Other Short Stories, written in English, was published in 2017.

Her short stories, feature articles, poems and song lyrics were selected for anthologies such as Tales of the Decongested, Chained To The Sky and Other Tales: The Fine Line Short Story Collection, Liars' League London, BBC Radio 4's Spice, BBC Radio 3's In Tune Live from Tate Modern, Conradology and The Stylist website.

== Awards and honours ==
In 2013 she was awarded the Arts Council England TLC Free Reads Award. Her story, “The Afterlife of Trees”, was shortlisted for the 2014 Carve Magazine Esoteric Short Story Contest and longlisted for the Fish Short Story Prize 2014.
