= Fan wiki =

Collaboratively-edited hypertext publication to document popular culture

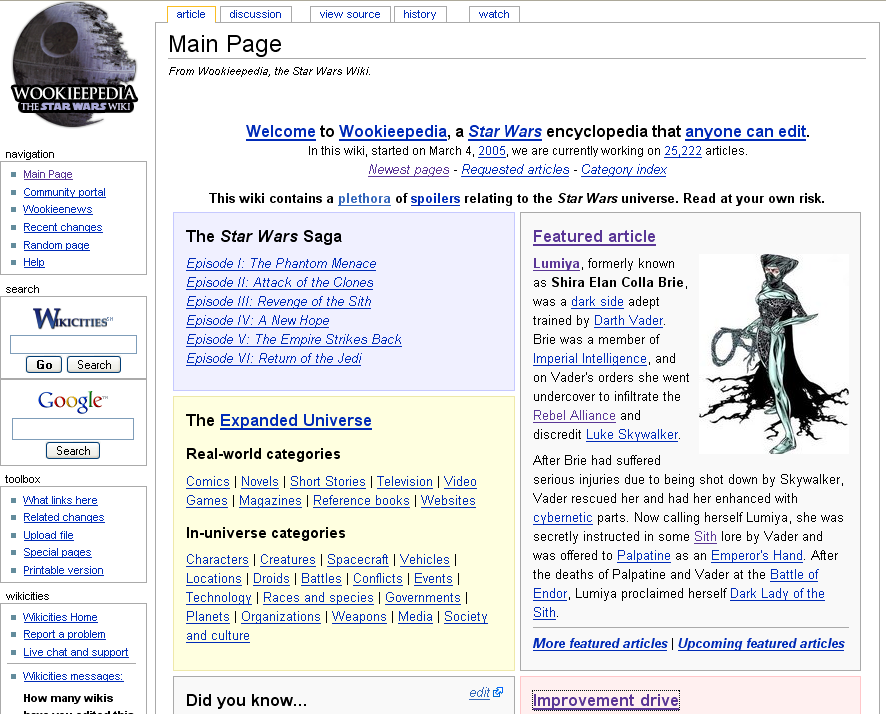
Main page of Wookieepedia on February 23, 2006

A fan wiki is a wiki created by fans of a popular culture topic. Fan wikis, which are a part of fandoms, cover television shows, film franchises, video games, comics, sports, and other topics. The primary purpose of a fan wiki is to document its topic area through collaborative editing. Fan wikis document their subjects at varying levels of detail. They also serve narrative and creative functions. Some present analysis, fan theories and fiction, and video game strategy guides and walkthroughs, while others only document official canon. Media and cultural studies scholars have studied fan wikis as forms of participatory culture that enable fans to build community.

Fan wikis were first published in the early-to-mid-2000s, some as a result of fans collaborating on Wikipedia and then forming their own separate wikis. Many fan wikis are hosted on Fandom, a for-profit wiki hosting service. Since the mid-2010s, some fan wiki communities have left Fandom over disagreements about advertising, outdated software, and corporate control.

== Description ==
A fan wiki is a wiki (Note: A wiki is a form of hypertext publication on the internet which is collaboratively edited and managed by its audience directly through a web browser. A typical wiki contains multiple pages that can either be edited by the public or limited to use within an organization for maintaining its internal knowledge base.) that is created by fans, primarily to document an object of popular culture. Fan wikis cover television shows, film franchises, video games, comic books, sports, and other topics. They are a part of fandoms, which are subcultures dedicated to a common popular culture interest. The digital humanities scholar Jason Mittell stated in 2013 that fan wikis were "[o]ne of the most popular and widespread uses of wikis".

Fan wikis usually operate according to internal policies. Editors reach decisions through discussion and consensus decision-making. Some wikis are more hierarchical, while others operate more collectively. They usually appoint a small group of editors to serve as system operators (sysops) or administrators, who have additional powers to enforce rules. Many fan wikis have rules that require editors to provide citations to reliable sources to verify their claims. For example, on The Tudors fan wiki, editors tended to rely upon scholarly nonfiction and traditional media sources in discussions.

== Functions ==
Fan wikis document and analyze their topic areas at different levels of detail. They are also spaces where editors can collaborate on creative works, including generating fan fiction and fan theory. Fans use fan wikis to interact with people with similar interests and assert cultural ownership over their wikis' subjects.

=== Documentation ===
A fan wiki's basic purpose is to document its topic area. Fan wikis generally cover their objects of study in depth; editors create extensive film character biographies, describe video game plots in detail, and present trivia about television episode productions. Wikipedia editors, by contrast, disfavor describing fictional elements at a high level of detail, referring to such material using the derogatory term fancruft. Mittell provides an example of fan wikis' level of detail: in 2010, the article for the minor character Daultay Dofine on Wookieepedia, a Star Wars franchise wiki, was about 3,500 words long and had been awarded featured status by the community for its high quality of writing. By contrast, the Dofine page on Wikipedia redirected readers to a list of minor Star Wars characters that did not have a description of the character.

Fan wikis also document their topics at different levels of detail. Some, such as the Battlestar Galactica Wiki, only cover the television show's official canon, while others, like Lostpedia, allow editors to analyze the show's themes and plot, summarize fan fiction and parodies, and speculate about the show. Fan wikis, such as the Star Trek wiki Memory Alpha, are often more comprehensive than official materials. Many video game wikis document game mechanics and include walkthroughs and strategy guides.

=== Narrativity and creativity ===
Fan wikis serve a narrative and creative function. Editors create their own narrative of a franchise, known as a fanon, based on their own interpretation of the wiki's subject. When editors hyperlink between and categorize articles, or update navigation lists, they creatively interpret the subject by connecting different topics and themes. Mittell compared editors' use of those tools on fan wikis to scholars writing reference texts about and annotated editions of "classical literature and mythology". In both cases, the creators analyze their subject and create "alternative narratives", which readers consult to fill gaps in their knowledge. Editors may also create or rely upon visual representations of their subject. In a case study of Lostpedia, the narrative scholar Laura Daniel Buchholz stated that editors organized their perception of the show based on the geography of the island and the creation of competing fan maps. Likewise, the information science scholar Olle Sköld compared the editors of the Dark Souls wiki to ecologists who explored, analyzed, and documented the landscape of Dark Souls II.

On some fan wikis, fans present their own theories based on speculation and original research. On wikis like Lostpedia and the American television series Supernatural wiki, there are dedicated pages for analysis of concepts, themes, and plot elements. Heroes Wiki, a wiki for the American television series, likewise featured spoilers and fan theories about future episodes and plot developments. Others, like the Battlestar Galactica Wiki and the Doctor Who franchise wiki, prohibit fan fiction or fan theories.

=== Community ===
Fan wikis serve a communal role. They allow editors with similar interests to share in their enthusiasm and knowledge of a franchise. Mittell and the media and cultural studies scholar Henry Jones have analyzed fan wikis as paratexts, which are a set of works that accompany and interact with a text. As part of fan wiki communities, editors work collaboratively to create a shared work. Some editors develop expertise in their wiki's policies and assist in tasks such as determining consensus, while others become familiar with evaluating the reliability of sources.

Fan wikis sometimes collaborate with their subjects. For example, the Star Trek Beyond writers Simon Pegg and Doug Jung consulted Memory Alpha and its administrators during the film's production, and Lucasfilm's Star Wars database manager contributed to Wookieepedia. Lostpedia became a part of the show's canon when its administrators worked with the runners of an official alternate reality game called the Lost Experience to hide clues on the wiki.

== History ==
Fan wikis were first published in the early 2000s. Many fan wikis formed out of Wikipedia over disputes among editors about the level of detail that should be provided in articles. These included fans of the television show Battlestar Galactica and the Star Wars franchise, who founded Wookieepedia after facing complaints about the "overabundance of minutiae related to Star Wars appearing on Wikipedia".

In 2004, the Wikipedia co-founder Jimmy Wales and the former Wikipedia board chair Angela Beesley founded Fandom under the name WikiCities, a for-profit wiki hosting service that hosted regional wikis for cities. In 2006, the company attracted venture capital funding and changed its name to Wikia. Wikia then began to assimilate independent fan wikis, such as Memory Alpha (a Star Trek fan wiki) and Wowpedia (a World of Warcraft fan wiki). In the late 2010s—after Fandom and Gamepedia were acquired and consolidated by the private equity firm TPG Inc.—several wikis began to leave the service, including the RuneScape, Zelda, and Minecraft wikis. Those wiki communities cited Fandom's advertising methods, issues with security and outdated software, and corporate control as reasons for migrating.

== See also ==
- Fansite
- List of fan wikis
- List of online encyclopedias
- List of wikis

== Sources ==
=== Book chapters and reference work sections ===
- Jones, Henry (2021). "Wikis". In Baker, Mona; Blaagaard, Bolette B.; Jones, Henry; Pérez-González, Luis (eds.). The Routledge Encyclopedia of Citizen Media. Critical Perspectives in Citizen Media (ebook ed.). London: Routledge. ISBN 978-1-315-61981-1.
- Mittell, Jason (2013). "Wikis and Participatory Fandom". In Delwiche, Aaron; Henderson, Jennifer Jacobs (eds.). The Participatory Cultures Handbook (ebook ed.). New York: Routledge. pp. 35–42. ISBN 978-0-203-11792-7.
- Re, Valentina (2016). "Beyond the Threshold: Paratext, Transcendence, and Time in the Contemporary Media Landscape". In Noto, Paolo; Pesce, Sara (eds.). The Politics of Ephemeral Digital Media: Permanence and Obsolescence in Paratexts. Routledge Studies in New Media and Cyberculture (ebook ed.). New York: Routledge. pp. 60–74. ISBN 978-1-315-71833-0.

=== Journal articles ===
- Booth, Paul (January 2009). "Narractivity and the Narrative Database: Media-based Wikis as Interactive Fan Fiction". Narrative Inquiry. 19 (2): 372–392. doi:10.1075/ni.19.2.09boo.
- Buchholz, Laura Daniel (2018). "Reconstructing Lost: Connecting Storyworld Geography to Narrative Comprehension in Online Wiki Communities". Frontiers of Narrative Studies. 4 (2): 248–262. doi:10.1515/fns-2018-0021.
- Comerford, Chris (November 2018). "Participatory Toolboxes: Franchise Fan Wikis as Tools of Textual Production" (PDF). Participations. 15 (2): 285–296.
- Hills, Matt (August 2015). "The Expertise of Digital Fandom as a 'Community of Practice': Exploring the Narrative Universe of Doctor Who". Convergence. 21 (3): 360–374. doi:10.1177/1354856515579844.
- Hunter, Rik (March 2011). "Erasing 'Property Lines': A Collaborative Notion of Authorship and Textual Ownership on a Fan Wiki". Computers and Composition. 28 (1): 40–56. doi:10.1016/j.compcom.2010.12.004.
- Matthews, Jolie Christine (January–March 2016). "Historical Inquiry in an Informal Fan Community: Online Source Usage and the TV Show The Tudors". Learning Outside of School Strand. The Journal of the Learning Sciences. 25 (1): 4–50. doi:10.1080/10508406.2015.1112285. JSTOR 43828388.
- Mittell, Jason (2009). "Sites of Participation: Wiki Fandom and the Case of Lostpedia". Praxis. Transformative Works and Cultures. 3. doi:10.3983/twc.2009.0118. Archived from the original on October 17, 2023.
- Sköld, Olle (2017). "Getting-to-Know: Inquiries, Sources, Methods, and the Production of Knowledge on a Videogame Wiki". Journal of Documentation. 73 (6): 1299–1321. doi:10.1108/JD-11-2016-0145.
- Toton, Sarah (January 17, 2008). "Cataloging Knowledge: Gender, Generative Fandom, and the Battlestar Wiki". Flow. University of Texas at Austin. Archived from the original on May 18, 2024.

=== News ===
- Bailey, Dustin (October 21, 2022). "The Biggest Zelda Wiki Goes Independent to Fight 'Corporate Consolidation,' Urging Others to Follow Suit". GamesRadar+. Archived from the original on December 12, 2023.
- Hinman, Michael (March 13, 2006). "Venture Capitalists Invest Wiki-millions". Tampa Bay Business Journal.
- Jackson, Gita (September 28, 2018). "Video Game Wikis Abandon Their Platform After Year Of Problems". Kotaku. Archived from the original on November 1, 2023.
- Stanton, Rich (October 4, 2023). "Minecraft Wiki Completes Exit from Fandom, Gets Ready to Fight Its Own Zombified Corpse". PC Gamer. Archived from the original on October 23, 2023.
- Tossell, Ivor (January 12, 2007). "It's a Wiki, Wiki World Out There". The Globe and Mail. p. R.20. ProQuest 383474262.
