= Memory Alpha =

Star Trek wiki

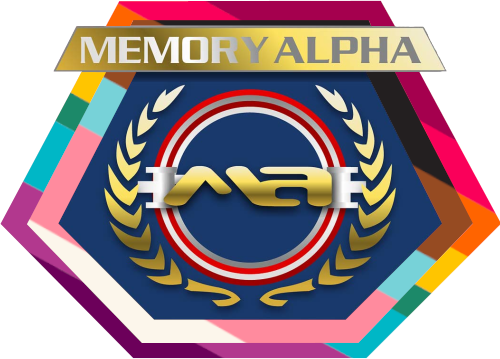
- Website type: Fan wiki; Online encyclopedia
- Owner: Communal
- Creators: Dan Carlson; Harry Doddema
- Revenue: Advertising
- Website: memory-alpha.fandom.com/wiki/Portal:Main
- Commercial: Yes
- Registration: Required
- Launched: December 5, 2003; 22 years ago
- Content license: Creative Commons Attribution-NonCommercial 4.0

Memory Alpha is a wiki encyclopedia for topics related to the Star Trek fictional universe. Created by Harry Doddema and Dan Carlson, it uses the wiki model and is hosted by Fandom on the MediaWiki software. As of September 2026, Memory Alpha contains over 66,000 articles in its English language edition. The site is also available in several other languages.

== History ==
In 1995, Dan Carlson created a personal Star Trek starship database called Starfleet Ship Registry. By 2000, he had expanded the database's scope and renamed it Starfleet Reference Database, including it as one of the five basic sections of his newly-launched website The Gigantic Collection of Star Trek Minutiae.

In the fall of 2003, Harry Doddema proposed the creation of a Star Trek wiki in a post on the Flare Sci-Fi Forums. Carlson was interested in the concept and the two of them went to work. Using Starfleet Reference Database as a framework, they named the project Memory Alpha, after the Federation's central library from the TOS episode "The Lights of Zetar". Memory Alpha officially launched on December 5, 2003, as a section of the Star Trek Minutiae website.

In April 2004, Memory Alpha was launched as its own website. In February 2005, Memory Alpha joined Wikicities (now known as Fandom). By September, it was the largest project on Wikicities and a central hub for Trekkies. That month, Memory Alpha received the Ex Astris Excellentia award from Ex Astris Scientia, a Star Trek reference site. The site was featured as the Sci-Fi Channel's Site of the Week for the week of October 10.

Blogger Will Richardson called the site "one of the most impressive [wikis] out there." By October 5, 2006, Memory Alpha had reached the 20,000 article mark. On June 20, 2007, Memory Alpha reached 25,000 articles.

In 2007, Entertainment Weekly named Memory Alpha one of the 25 Essential Fansites. Simon Pegg, actor and writer for Star Trek Beyond, used Memory Alpha as a resource in the writing process of the film, even asking the community's founders to name and establish etymology for vokaya, a Vulcan mineral that enables Spock to locate Nyota Uhura. Star Trek: Discovery's showrunners have described Memory Alpha as "an amazing resource."

== See also ==
- List of fan wikis
- List of online encyclopedias
- List of wikis
