= Wowpedia =

Warcraft fictional universe fan website

Warcraft Wiki
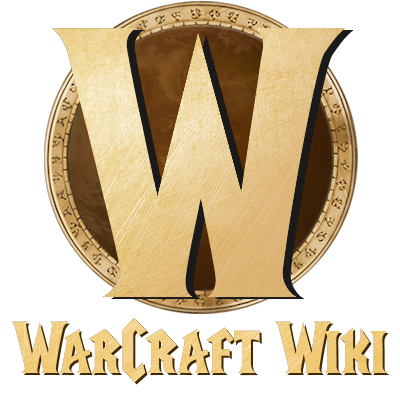
- Website type: Fan wiki
- Predecessor: Wowpedia
- Owner: wiki.gg
- Creator: Multiple
- Website: warcraft.wiki.gg
- Commercial: No
- Registration: Optional
- Launched: October 12, 2023; 3 years ago
- Current status: Active
- Content license: Creative Commons Attribution-ShareAlike 4.0 International

Warcraft Wiki (formerly known as Wowpedia and WoWWiki) is a fan wiki about the Warcraft fictional universe. It covers all of the Warcraft games, including the MMORPG World of Warcraft. It is both a specialized wiki built around the Warcraft universe and a collaborative space for players to develop and publish strategies for Warcraft games. It was officially announced on 25 October 2010.

== History and description ==
Warcraft Wiki began as WoWWiki on 24 November 2004 as a source of information pertaining to the World of Warcraft universe, including the RTS games, novels, the RPG reference books, manga, and other written sources, along with the WoW expansion packs from The Burning Crusade to The War Within and the Classic releases.

=== WoWWiki ===
WoWWiki
- Website type: Fan wiki
- Owner: Fandom
- Creator: Multiple
- Website: wowwiki-archive.fandom.com
- Commercial: Yes
- Registration: Optional
- Launched: November 24, 2004; 21 years ago
- Current status: Archived
- Content license: Creative Commons Attribution-ShareAlike 3.0 Unported

WoWWiki.com was launched on November 24, 2004, the day after the release of World of Warcraft (WoW), as a source of information pertaining to WoW and the interface modification suite Cosmos. At various points in its development history, it was described as the "best known MMO wiki", "the second largest English-language wiki in the world behind Wikipedia", and the "mother of all WoW informational sources."

On May 2, 2007, it was announced that WoWWiki would be moving to Wikia, a for-profit wiki-hosting company. In September 2009, WoWWiki was noted as Wikia's largest wiki at that time.

On November 1, 2010, in an interview with the Toronto Star, Jimmy Wales described sites in entertainment and gaming as the most popular part of Wikia, stating that "in gaming, every major video game has a huge wiki about it. World of Warcraft is probably the biggest. ... Just for that particular wiki alone, I think we see 4 to 5 million people a month."

In late 2010, Wikia introduced a new fixed-width skin which caused layout issues with many articles and broke JavaScript-based features such as tooltips, as well as generating reports of eye strain and headaches. The dispute with Wikia led some of the WoWWiki community to seek a different host. Most of the administrators of WoWWiki, as well as the other active contributors, moved to a new site called Wowpedia, which was announced shortly thereafter.

In May 2020, WoWWiki was archived and the wiki's userbase was merged into the much more active Wowpedia, somewhat reuniting the two communities once again.

=== Wowpedia ===
Wowpedia
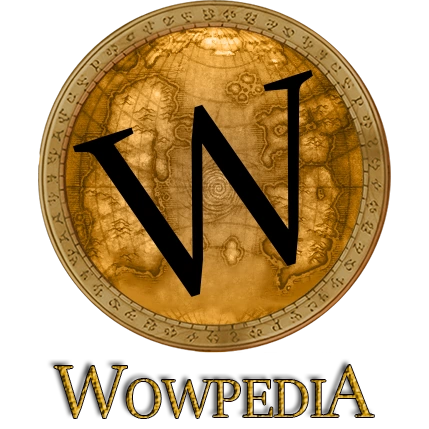
- Website type: Fan wiki
- Owner: Fandom
- Creator: Multiple
- Website: wowpedia.fandom.com
- Commercial: No
- Registration: Optional
- Launched: 20 October 2010; 16 years ago
- Current status: Active
- Content license: Creative Commons Attribution-ShareAlike 3.0 Unported

The content and article history was forked to Wowpedia.org, hosted by Curse, on 20 October 2010, with most of the administrators of WoWWiki, as well as many of the other active contributors, moving to Wowpedia.

On December 4, 2010, Blizzard Entertainment began to incorporate links to Wowpedia, as well as the database site Wowhead, into the new version of its World of Warcraft Community Site.

Wowpedia's usefulness and strength as a wiki is in its establishment as a touchstone of "participatory culture", a "discourse community [...] in which more experienced contributors and various types of administrators play more or less strong roles in the editing process, often asking questions about edits made and offering suggestions." The success of Wowpedia has been described as the results of its editors' "blissful productivity, hard work and dedication at play". Wowpedia's format and coverage of the Warcraft games and lore contained therein has been used as an illustration of "the dedication of the community and how fans help each other when Blizzard’s official documents do not provide adequate guidance about gameplay features or the best way to engage with the game".

In July 2013, Wowpedia moved to Curse's Gamepedia game-based wiki hosting service. In December 2014, Wowpedia's URL was changed to a gamepedia domain, but the onscreen Wowpedia identity such as logos was retained.

==== Fandom ====
As of December 2018, control of Wowpedia once again fell under Wikia (now known as Fandom) due to its acquisition of Gamepedia from Curse.

In September 2023, the admins of Wowpedia initiated a vote to move the wiki away from Fandom, citing a number of concerns with the way that Fandom had been running things, including intrusive ads in the middle of pages. The vote concluded on October 2, 2023, resulting in a winning 'Yes' vote.

=== Warcraft Wiki ===
Following the vote in September 2023, Wowpedia forked from Fandom to the wiki.gg hosting service on October 12, 2023, and became known as Warcraft Wiki.

== Research on WoWWiki ==
In March 2008, SXSW held a panel on "How Gamers are Adopting the Wiki Way", which heavily featured WoWWiki and focused on the wiki as a collaborative strategy space for players. In a 2009 article, Lee Sherlock argued that WoWWiki constituted a collaborative writing genre, distinct from forums and walkthroughs (e.g. GameFAQs). Rik Hunter treated WoWWiki as a fan "affinity space". Both Sherlock and Hunter argued that WoWWiki was a primary example of a broader trend in digital media where consumers and users became producers of information. More recently, Hunter has analyzed talk pages for patterns of collaboration and suggests that "Successful collaborative writing on WoWWiki is a result of writers sharing common 'habits of mind,' and collaboration can be disrupted by those who hold more author-centric perspectives of textual ownership." In a follow-up article, Hunter further analyzed talk pages to "describe a model of writing that accounts for readers-as-writers." Faltin Karlsen saw WoWWiki's size and complexity as evidence for the scale of emergent complexity in massively multiplayer online role-playing games (MMORPGs) like World of Warcraft.

== See also ==
- List of fan wikis
- List of online encyclopedias
- List of wikis
