= Curse LLC =

Network of gaming websites

- Type: Subsidiary
- Industry: PC gaming communities, E-sports, VoIP
- Founded: 2006; 20 years ago
- Founder: Hubert Thieblot
- Defunct: December 2018; 7 years ago
- Fate: CurseForge assets merged into Twitch; assets later acquired by Overwolf and Magic Find. Spin-off called Curse Media acquired by Fandom.
- Headquarters: Huntsville, Alabama, United States
- Key people: Donovan Duncan (President, 2015–2019)
- Parent: Twitch Interactive (2016–2018)
- Website: http://curse.com/

Curse LLC was a gaming company that managed the video game mod host CurseForge, wiki host Gamepedia, and the Curse Network of gaming community websites.

The company was headquartered in Huntsville, Alabama, and had offices in San Francisco, New York City, Los Angeles, Brighton, and Berlin.

Curse initially focused on offering mods for various video games. As it expanded, the company began to develop and acquire gaming communities (particularly focusing on MMORPG titles such as World of Warcraft, as well as other games such as Minecraft), wikis, as well as offering voice chat services. The company also sponsored an eponymous eSports club, which competed primarily in League of Legends.

In August 2016, Curse announced that it had agreed to be acquired by Amazon via its subsidiary Twitch Interactive for an undisclosed amount. In December 2018, Fandom announced that they had acquired Curse Media that included Gamepedia wiki farm and D&D Beyond. The remainder of Curse's assets became part of Twitch. In mid-2020, CurseForge was sold from Twitch to Overwolf.

== History ==
=== 2006–2010 ===
Curse was born out of founder Hubert Thieblot's "hardcore" love of World of Warcraft. After leaving school, Thieblot began to turn his passion into a business, launching CurseBeta in 2006, offering up add-ons and modifications. In short order, the site exponentially increased in traffic and popularity. As the funding for Curse increased, it proceeded to develop several high-profile sites in-house while acquiring larger sites with already established communities and content, particularly for MMO games such as RuneScape.

Curse also offered a Curse Premium subscription for additional functionality in the Curse Client such as one-click updating of all add-ons, higher download bandwidth, cloud backups and sync, and an ad-free browsing experience on the Curse website.

=== 2010–2016 ===
In 2011, Inc. 500 ranked Curse Inc. as the 405th fastest growing company in the United States, and the San Francisco Business Times ranked it 22nd in their list of the "Top 100 Fastest Growing Companies in the San Francisco Bay Area". On December 14, 2012, Curse officially launched the Gamepedia wiki farm.

In April 2012, Ernst & Young named Thieblot as a semifinalist in their "Ernst & Young Entrepreneur of the Year" program for Northern California. By June 2012, Curse's monthly worldwide traffic was reported by Quantcast as being in excess of 21 million unique visitors. Curse continued to acquire more communities such as MTG Salvation, which they finalized on December 17, 2012. On June 26, 2013, Curse announced in a press conference that it would relocate their chief headquarters to Huntsville, Alabama, leaving their sales office in San Francisco. On May 7, 2014, Curse introduced Curse Profiles, an integrated social media system in Gamepedia offering a wide range of features. The service allowed users to add wikis to their favorites list, earn Wikipoints and Levels, display personal statistics (such as global editing leaderboards, number of edits, etc.), and change and set global preferences; the service also introduced a new user page system, a change from the MediaWiki standard user pages, including a new commenting system. Curse expressed a long-term interest in expanding content and communities as their prime concern.

=== Acquisition by Twitch Interactive ===
On August 16, 2016, Amazon.com Inc. announced via subsidiary Twitch Interactive that it would acquire Curse, Inc. for an undisclosed amount. In April 2017, the Curse desktop app was renamed to Twitch. The Irvine, California-based Curse team worked under Twitch. The Huntsville, Alabama-based media team stayed as part of Curse. As part of the migration to the Twitch Desktop App, the Curse Premium program was shut down and premium features were released to all users. The ad-free Curse Network program was retired. Muthead Supporter and Gamepedia Pro continued to exist.

=== Acquisition of Curse Media by Fandom ===
On December 12, 2018, it was announced that Fandom, Inc. had reached an agreement to acquire the spin-off of Curse called Curse Media from Twitch Interactive for an undisclosed amount. This included Gamepedia, Curse Network, D&D Beyond, Muthead, and Futhead. After having spun off Curse Media, Curse LLC was dissolved and its assets, including BukkitDev, CurseForge, CurseForge Network and Union For Gamers, were merged into Twitch Interactive. The acquisition was completed in January 2019.

Organizationally, Fandom and Curse Media merged. Fandom and Curse began discussions in late 2018, shortly after the Fandom-Curse Media merger was announced. Part of these discussions was "Project Crossover", an initiative to work with wiki admins on both platforms to combine wikis for the same subject and to address subdomain conflicts. Gamepedia wikis were migrated to the Fandom domain and were converted to the Unified Community Platform (UCP) where both received the same FandomDesktop theme. A Gamepedia badge was added to denote wikis migrated from Gamepedia.

== Legacy ==
Fandom later sold D&D Beyond to Hasbro in 2022. Fandom still operates Gamepedia, Muthead, and Futhead.

=== Fandom's sale of Curse Network to Magic Find, and Twitch's sale of Union For Gamers to Magic Find ===
In 2019 and 2020, Magic Find acquired Curse Network from Fandom. Magic Find acquired Union For Gamers from Twitch in 2020.

=== Twitch's sale of CurseForge to Overwolf ===
On June 22, 2020, Overwolf announced that it had acquired CurseForge from Twitch for an undisclosed amount. After December 2, 2020, the Twitch Desktop App no longer manages mods. CurseForge's mod management functionality can since be found in the CurseForge app, which is for Windows (Overwolf required) and macOS (Standalone, Overwolf not required). In June 2022, the standalone CurseForge app was released for Linux and Windows, starting with World of Warcraft support, later adding support for Minecraft: Java Edition. Overwolf introduced a new CurseForge API, removing the API from Twitch, for third party clients outside of the CurseForge–Overwolf ecosystem to use and introduced an option for project authors to not distribute their projects to third parties where they do not earn revenue.

== Products ==
=== Curse Media ===
Curse Media was a department of Curse LLC for the gaming community websites it owned and managed. It was spun off as its own company prior to its sale to Fandom.

=== Gamepedia ===
On December 14, 2012, Curse launched Gamepedia, a wiki hosting platform dedicated to video games and written by gamers. The site had since increased in popularity, with, as of April 2019, 1,293,790 contributors, 6,224,464 articles and 2,195 wikis. Gamepedia hosted a number of official wikis, which were endorsed and supported by the game developers themselves. High-profile wikis such as the Official Witcher Wiki, the Official Minecraft Wiki, the Official ARK: Survival Evolved Wiki, Dota 2 Wiki, Leaguepedia, COD Wiki, and Wowpedia had hundreds of thousands of edits across thousands of accounts. These wikis were also available in several languages.

On December 12, 2018, ownership of Gamepedia was transferred to Fandom.

=== Curse Network ===
Curse owned and operated multiple high-traffic gaming websites, including Azurilland, Diablofans, Hearthpwn, MMO-Champion, Arena Junkies, Reign of Gaming, LoL Pro, Minecraft Forum, Guild Wars 2 Guru, and FPS General. Curse also acquired the first person shooter statistics and science website Symthic which focuses on the statistical analysis of data from FPS games, including such details as weight, accuracy, and weapon drift. Curse partnered with GOG.com in 2014 to provide a free game from their library for Curse Premium subscribers.

In 2019 and 2020, Magic Find acquired Curse Network from Fandom.

=== Curse Entertainment ===
Curse also produced videos in-house for their official YouTube channel, Curse Entertainment. The lineup included Curse Weekly Roundup, the Minecraft Update, the WoW Weekly Recap, the League Update, and the Pokémon Update. Curse also provides live coverage of game industry events including the Penny Arcade Expo, Gamescom, MineCon, BlizzCon, and the Eve Online Fanfest.

Curse historically broadcast livestreamed content on their Own3D YouTube channel until Own3D ceased operations as a company on January 31, 2013.

With Curse's acquisition by Fandom, Curse Entertainment was renamed to Fandom Games. Fandom Games publishes Honest Game Trailers, which had been published on the Smosh Games YouTube channel until Fandom acquired Screen Junkies.

=== CurseForge, Curse Client and Curse Voice ===
==== CurseForge ====
CurseForge hosts user generated content such as plugins, add-ons and mods for video games including Minecraft: Java Edition, World of Warcraft, The Sims 4, StarCraft II, and Kerbal Space Program. CurseForge offers authors their CurseForge Reward Program which allows authors to earn revenue using Author Reward Points that are allocated to a percentage of a monthly pool. CurseForge offers authors a 70% cut of revenue. CurseForge also features an app for Windows, macOS and Linux that allows users to easily download and install plugins, add-ons, and mods for some of the games it hosts mods for.

==== Kerbal CurseForge ====
On May 6, 2014, CurseForge introduced Kerbal CurseForge as an official repository of modifications and add-ons for the popular game Kerbal Space Program On May 6, 2014, developers Squad announced the partnership; Squad COO Adrián Goya said of the service, "Modders have helped make Kerbal Space Program a more open, more rewarding game experience for our players. Curse is an important partner because their team is passionate and experienced in caring for and growing online game communities, such as our amazing playerbase for Kerbal Space Program."

Additionally, Curse's Author Platform Evangelist Bryan McLemore stated, "We've got a great platform and a tremendous team that will be supporting the amazing modders for Kerbal Space Program. We also expect the millions of gamers who frequent Curse every month to see Kerbal Space Program as a great addition to our existing community." Kerbal CurseForge already boasts 94,300 downloads from its central repository.

=== Curse Client ===
Curse Client was an add-on and modification management service from Curse, with support for World of Warcraft, Runes of Magic, Rift, World of Tanks, The Elder Scrolls V: Skyrim, Minecraft, and Kerbal Space Program. The client functioned as a lightweight alternative to traditional add-on management tools, and features synchronization across multiple personal computers, add-on setting backups, and a privately developed security system. The client was supported by the CurseForge website, which allows for the uploading and reviewing of plugins, add-ons, and modifications.

=== Curse Voice ===
Curse Voice was a Voice over IP (VoIP) and instant messaging platform produced in-house by Curse. Intended to replace other VOIP solutions for games such as League of Legends, the client had a robust feature set, including an in-game voice overlay, an auto-match making service for automatically connecting users to the members of their team, and the use of URL links to join sessions. It also allowed users to automatically import friends from detected platforms. It featured text messaging, voice chat, video chat, screen sharing, a friend system and servers. The client was originally rejected by Riot Games, who felt that the timers included for various spawn times could be considered cheating, but Curse has since removed the offending content and brought the software in line with the terms of service for League of Legends.

Curse launched an open beta of Curse Voice for Windows in May 2014 and had a million users in its first week. Curse Voice initially focused on League of Legends support. As of November 2014, German version is still in the beta-phase. In 2015, Curse Voice initiated a PR campaign to show users, developers and publishers all of the benefits that the service had to offer. The service boasted how its safety features could help prevent users from getting swatted with Curse's CTO explaining how this was possible in an interview with Polygon. Other publications such as IGN and GameCrate picked up the story. On May 6, Curse reported on the growth of its VoIP service on GameSpot and Game Informer as it prepared to show off the service at E3 2015. In June 2015, Curse Voice expanded its offerings by releasing apps for Mac, Android and iOS, giving users more ways to use the service while on the go or at home. Publications like Kotaku and PC Gamer recommended using the service while playing online games like League of Legends. Consequently, on July 7, SEC reports revealed that Riot Games had invested $30 million in Curse, but no further details were revealed at the time. Curse stated that they wanted to help game developers improve their in-game chat by integrating Curse Voice and raised $52M in funding. Hi-Rez, the developers of SMITE, said that Curse Voice has "brought a lot of positivity to SMITE, some concerns were also brought up." A Curse Voice whitepaper showed that Robocraft saw a 258% increase in active players after integrating Curse Voice. With all of these big gains in the Curse Voice Client, Curse officially announced the opening of a new headquarters for their VoIP service on September 10 to Irvine, California.

Curse Voice only supported game modding for Minecraft through a plugin.

In 2016, Curse Voice was rebranded and redesigned as Curse. It brought modding support for more games such as WoW. After being acquired by Twitch, the Curse app received an update adding the ability to "sync" Curse accounts with Twitch accounts. The Curse app added screen sharing and video calling in 2016.

On March 16, 2017, the Curse app was rebranded as the Twitch Desktop App and received a redesign. The Curse team became part of Twitch Interactive. The Curse mobile app was rebranded as the Twitch Messenger app. VentureBeat stated that this was an attempt to compete with Discord, "the dominant social platform in the gaming space." The Twitch Desktop App removed VOIP features in February 2019.

In March 2018, The Esports Observer reported that two years after investing $30M in Curse, Riot Games added voice chat to League of Legends.

=== BukkitDev ===
One of the larger sites in the CurseForge network, BukkitDev is a collection of Minecraft plugins for the Bukkit development platform, a platform which has become the de facto standard for Minecraft plugins within the last few years. As of May 2014, BukkitDev hosts 13,570 plugins and 8,337 unique users. The Bukkit system has proven so effective and widespread, that on February 28, 2012, Mojang, the makers of Minecraft, hired the developers to improve Minecraft's support of server and client modifications and plugins.

=== Union For Gamers ===
Union For Gamers (UFG) is a multi-channel network (MCN) YouTube Network Union that provides creators with 90% of revenue for a dashboard and tools that offer detailed analytics, access to audio tracks and a breakdown of the top videos that earn creators revenue.

Curse partnered with YouTube content producer Athene in March 2012 for a YouTube partnership program and offered a wide range of features and tools.

Curse has stated that the Union For Gamers has a "user-first approach", offering 90% revenue share (where the content producer receives 90% of video profits), a non-capped contract (there is no maximum amount of money that could be paid out to content producers, unlike capped contracts, where, regardless of the amount your video earns, you can only earn up to a certain amount), no lock-in (content producers are free to terminate their contract whenever they choose), and no requirements for upload schedules or Curse endorsements.

Union For Gamers also offers several tools to content producers, arranged in a dashboard format. The dashboard includes summary boxes which track income, video data, referrals, and previous month comparisons, and a graph feature for revenue and traffic comparison. Tied into the dashboard is a referral system, allowing for additional income to be passively generated by referring parties. Additionally, Curse provides content producers with a knowledge database and support system, exclusive access to Curse logos and video clips.

From the Dashboard, users have access to all their videos, earnings break down, and a wide range of sounds and music provided by Epidemic Sound and AudioMicro. They also have access to Epoxy, a one-stop-shop for their other social media accounts. From there, they can upload new videos or track their Twitter, Facebook, and Instagram accounts. Epidemic also helps create short clips of uploaded videos, pre-formatted to meet specific social media requirements.

In 2020, Magic Find acquired Union For Gamers from Twitch.

=== Team Curse ===
Curse formerly sponsored a professional team, known collectively as Team Curse, that competed in League of Legends and Call of Duty, which in addition to various high-profile wins have garnered sponsorship from companies such as Nissan, Alienware, and Cooler Master.

In December 2014, it was announced that the team would drop the Curse name due to new League of Legends Championship Series sponsorship rules (in particular, Curse had wanted to have Curse Voice be a sponsor through other teams, which would prohibit it from being title sponsor of another team). It was ultimately announced in January 2015 that the Team Curse organization would merge into Team Liquid.
