= Hitchhiking =

Soliciting a ride in a stranger's road vehicle

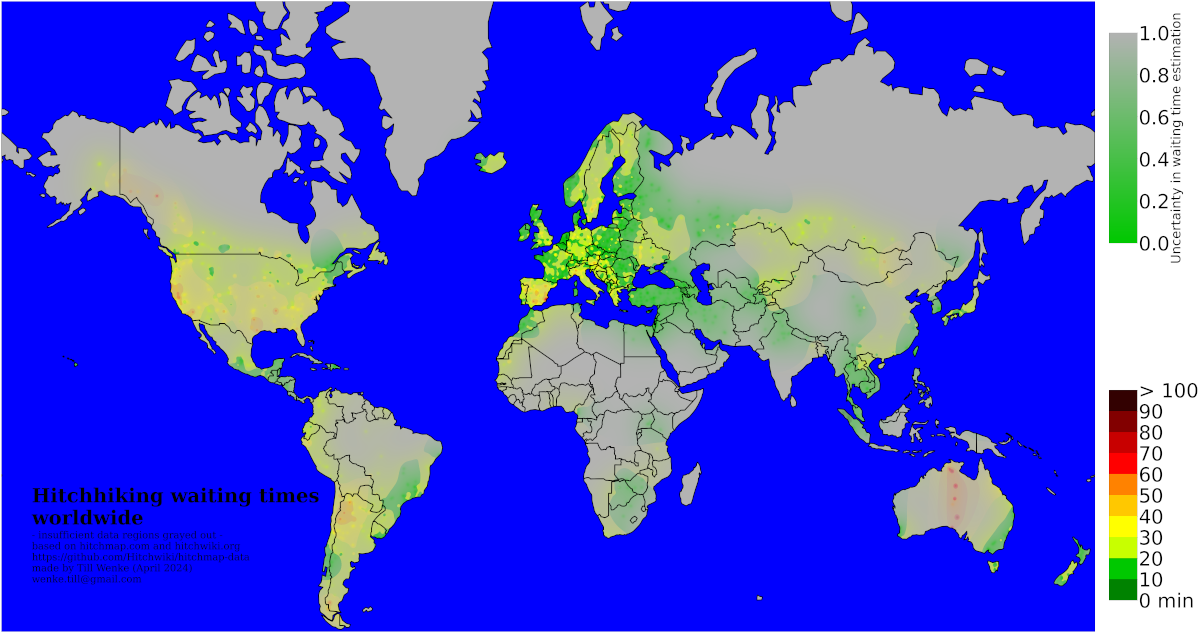
Hitchhiking waiting times worldwide with uncertainties of estimation (2024)

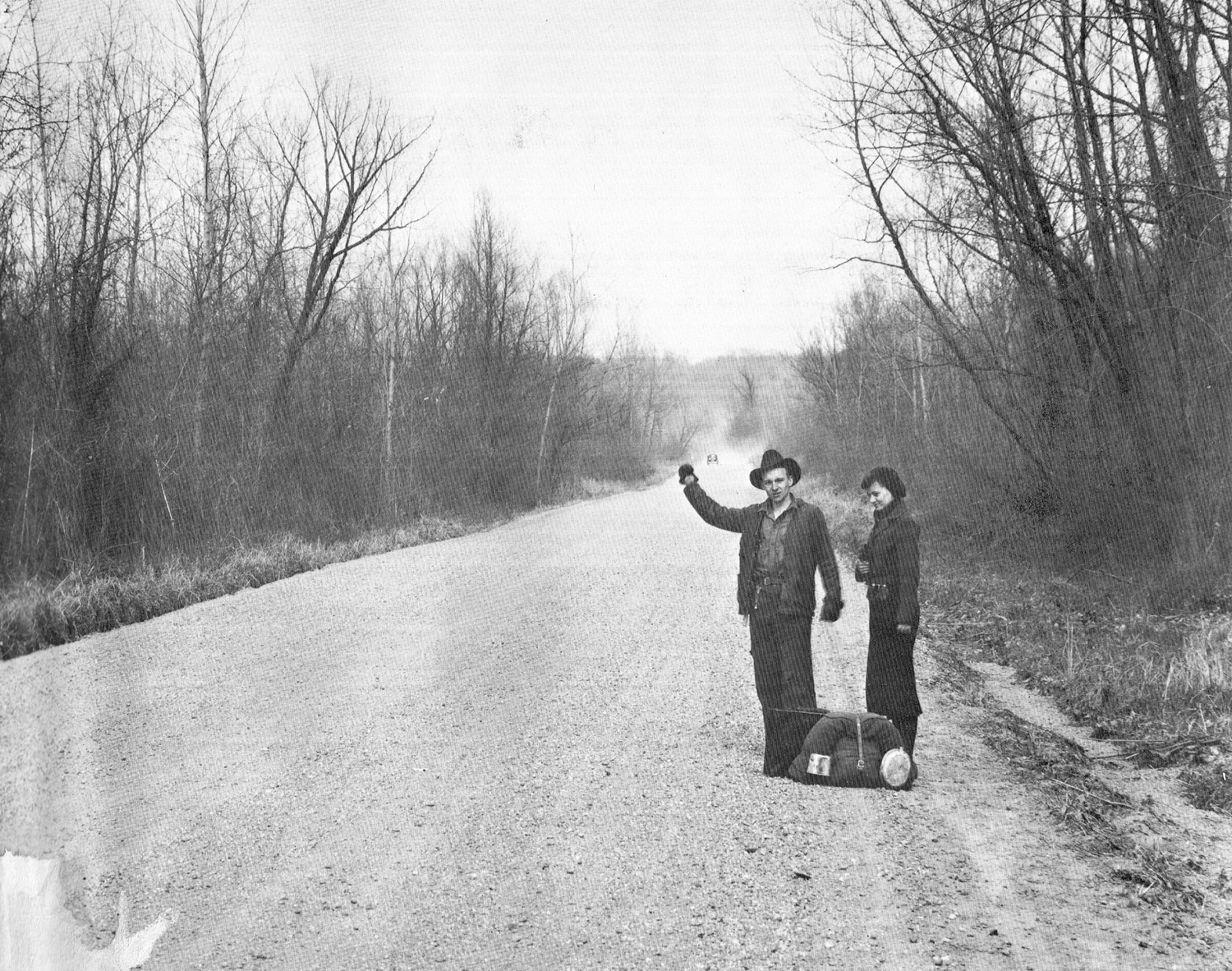
A man and woman hitchhiking near Vicksburg, Mississippi, in 1936, photograph by Walker Evans

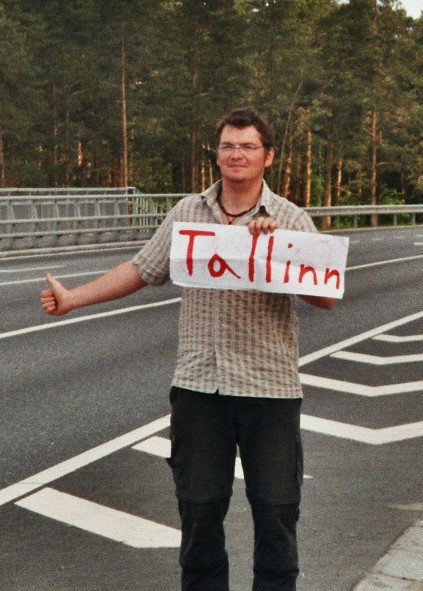
A man with both a physical gesture and a sign

Hitchhiking (also known as hitch-hiking, hitching, thumbing, and autostop) is a means of transportation that relies on soliciting rides from individuals, usually strangers. Recognized hand gestures, signage, and casual prearrangement, as in a solicitation at a rest stop, are used.

Most hitchhikes are free. Occasionally on a longer ride the driver may request their guest chip in towards gas, or coffee and such at a break; more often than asking they will volunteer to pay for such things themselves, recognizing that a person hitchhiking probably is low on funds. Casual contribution by the hitcher towards expenses does not void a ride as a hitchhike, but arranging payment in advance, regardless of who is providing the transport, is fee-for-service, however informal.

== Signaling methods ==
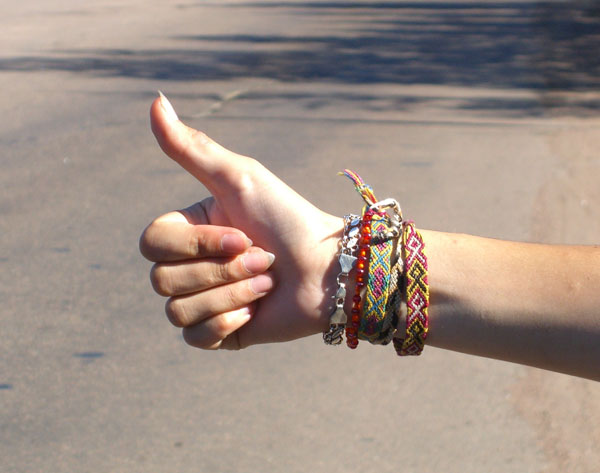
A typical hitchhiker's gesture in Europe, North America, South America, and Australia

Hitchhikers use a variety of signals, typically hand gestures, or displays, including signs, to indicate they need a ride.

Common hand gestures include:

- In most of Europe, North America, South America and Australia, most hitchhikers stand with their back facing the direction of travel. The hitchhiker typically extends their arm towards the road with the thumb of the closed hand pointing upward or in the direction of vehicle travel.

The gesture is unique to hitchhiking, and distinct from the waving display and arm motion of hailing a cab, or seeking to flag a vehicle down in an emergency.

- In some African countries, the hitchhiker's hand is held with the palm facing upwards.

== Legality ==
Two of the signs used in the United States, forbidding hitchhiking

Hitchhiking is historically a common practice worldwide, and there are very few places in the world where laws exist to restrict it. However, a minority of countries have laws that restrict hitchhiking at certain locations. In the United States, for example, some local governments have laws outlawing hitchhiking, on the basis of drivers' and hitchhikers' safety. In Canada, several highways have restrictions on hitchhiking, particularly in British Columbia and the 400-series highways in Ontario. In all countries in Europe, it is legal to hitchhike and in some places even encouraged. However, worldwide, even where hitchhiking is permitted, laws forbid hitchhiking in places where pedestrians are banned, such as the Autobahn (Germany), Autostrade (Italy), motorways (United Kingdom and continental Europe, with the exception of, at least, Lithuania) or Interstate highways (United States), although hitchhikers often obtain rides at entrances and truck stops where it is legal, at least throughout Europe with the exception of Italy.

== Community ==
In recent years, hitchhikers have started efforts to strengthen their community. Examples include the annual Hitchgathering, an event organized by hitchhikers, for hitchhikers, and websites such as Hitchwiki, which are platforms for hitchhikers to share tips and provide a way of looking up good hitchhiking spots around the world.

Hitchhiking has also seen a rise in popularity amongst travel influencers and YouTube video bloggers, who travel to obscure (by Western standards) locations like China, Central Asia, and South East Asia.

== Decline ==
See § Safety below.

In 2011, Freakonomics Radio reviewed sparse data about hitchhiking, and identified a steady decline in hitchhiking in the US since the 1970s, which it attributed to a number of factors, including a greater lack of trust of strangers, lower air travel costs due to deregulation, the presence of more money in the economy to pay for travel, and more numerous and more reliable cars.

In an experiment conducted in 2025, Swedish journalist Lukas Deininger hitchhiked from Mo i Rana, Norway to Umeå, Sweden. The initial wait for a car passing over the Norway–Sweden border took three and a half hours, and the combined journey of 477 kilometres (296 mi) lasted for approximately 27 hours, including sleep.

Even though the dangers of hitchhiking were graphically portrayed in much earlier "scare" movies like 1945's Detour, in which a psychotic woman hitchhiker terrorizes another hitchhiker, and the serial murderer driven The Hitch-Hiker in 1953, the marked increase in fear of hitchhiking from the early 1970s on is the immediate consequence of the diffusion of movies such as The Texas Chain Saw Massacre (1974), The Hitcher (1986), and a few real incidents involving imperiled hitchhikers, including the kidnapping of Colleen Stan in California.

Some British researchers discuss reasons for hitchhiking's decline in the UK, and possible means of reviving it in safer and more organized forms.

== Public policy support ==
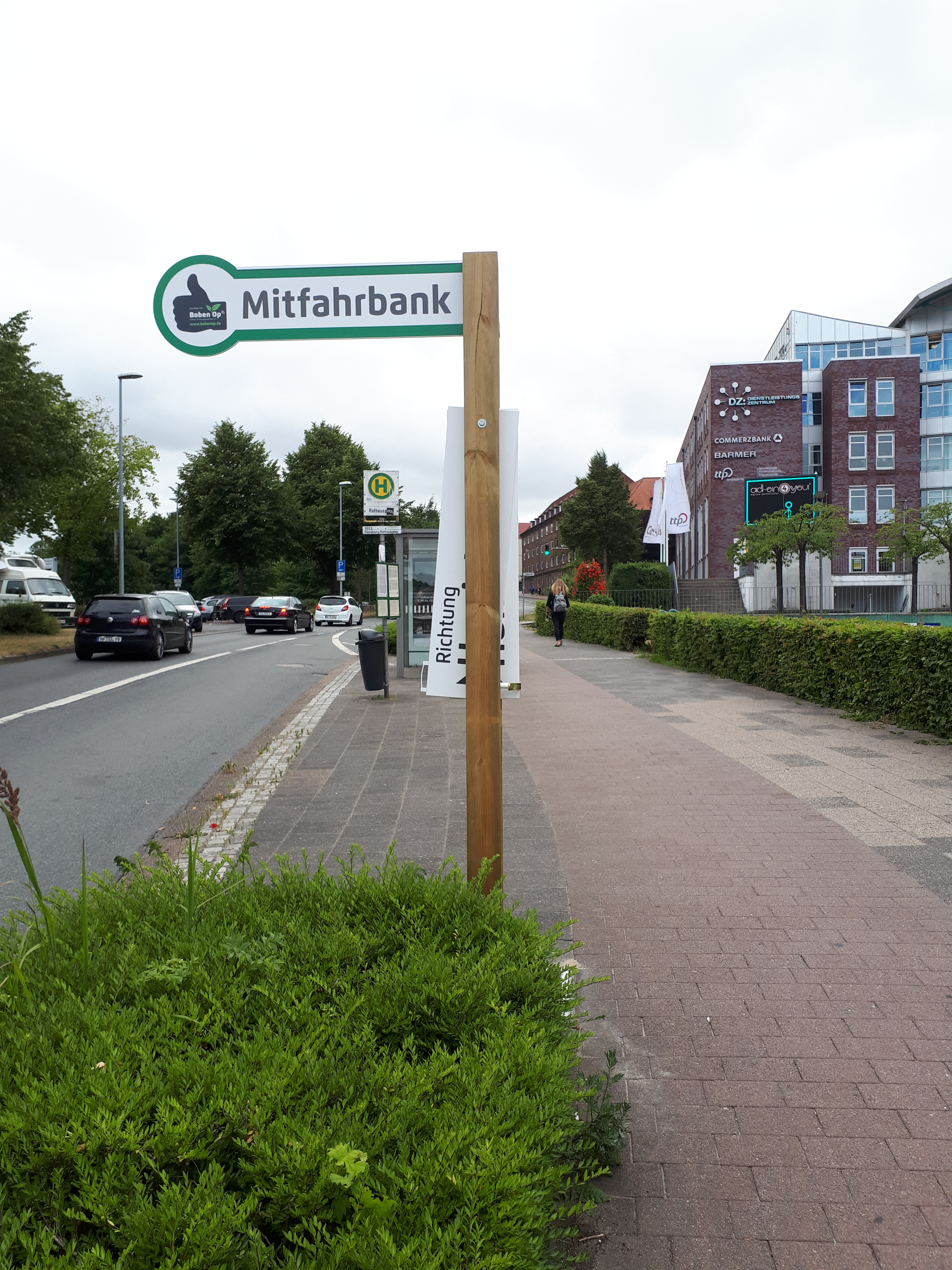
Mitfahrbank with destination signs in Flensburg, Germany

Since the mid-2010s, local authorities in rural areas in Germany have started to support hitchhiking, and this has spread to Austria and the German-speaking region of Belgium. The objectives are both social and environmental: as ride sharing improves mobility for local residents (particularly young and old people without their own cars) in places where public transport is inadequate, thus improving networking among local communities in an environmentally friendly way. This support typically takes the form of providing hitchhiking benches (in German Mitfahrbänke) where people hoping for a ride can wait for cars. These benches are usually brightly coloured and located at the exit from a village, sometimes at an existing bus stop lay-by where vehicles can pull in safely. Some are even provided with large fold-out or slide-out signs with place names allowing hitchers to clearly signal where they want to go. Some Mitfahrbänke have been installed with the help of the EU's LEADER programme for rural local development

In Austria, Mitfahrbänke are especially common in Lower Austria and Tyrol, and are promoted by the Federal Ministry of Agriculture, Regions and Tourism under its klimaaktiv climate protection initiative. In 2018 the Tyrolean MobilitäterInnen ("mobility workers") network published a Manual for the Successful Introduction of Hitch-hiking Benches.

== Safety ==
An episode of About Safety, a 1970s educational children's show, about the safety of hitchhiking

Limited data is available regarding the safety of hitchhiking. Compiling good safety data requires counting hitchhikers, counting rides, and counting problems, all difficult tasks.

Two studies on the topic include a 1974 California Highway Patrol study and a 1989 German federal police (Bundeskriminalamt Wiesbaden) study. The California study found that hitchhikers were not disproportionately likely to be victims of crime. The German study concluded that the actual risk is much lower than the publicly perceived risk; the authors did not advise against hitchhiking in general. They found that in some cases there were verbal disputes or inappropriate comments, but physical attacks were very rare.

Recommended safety practices include:

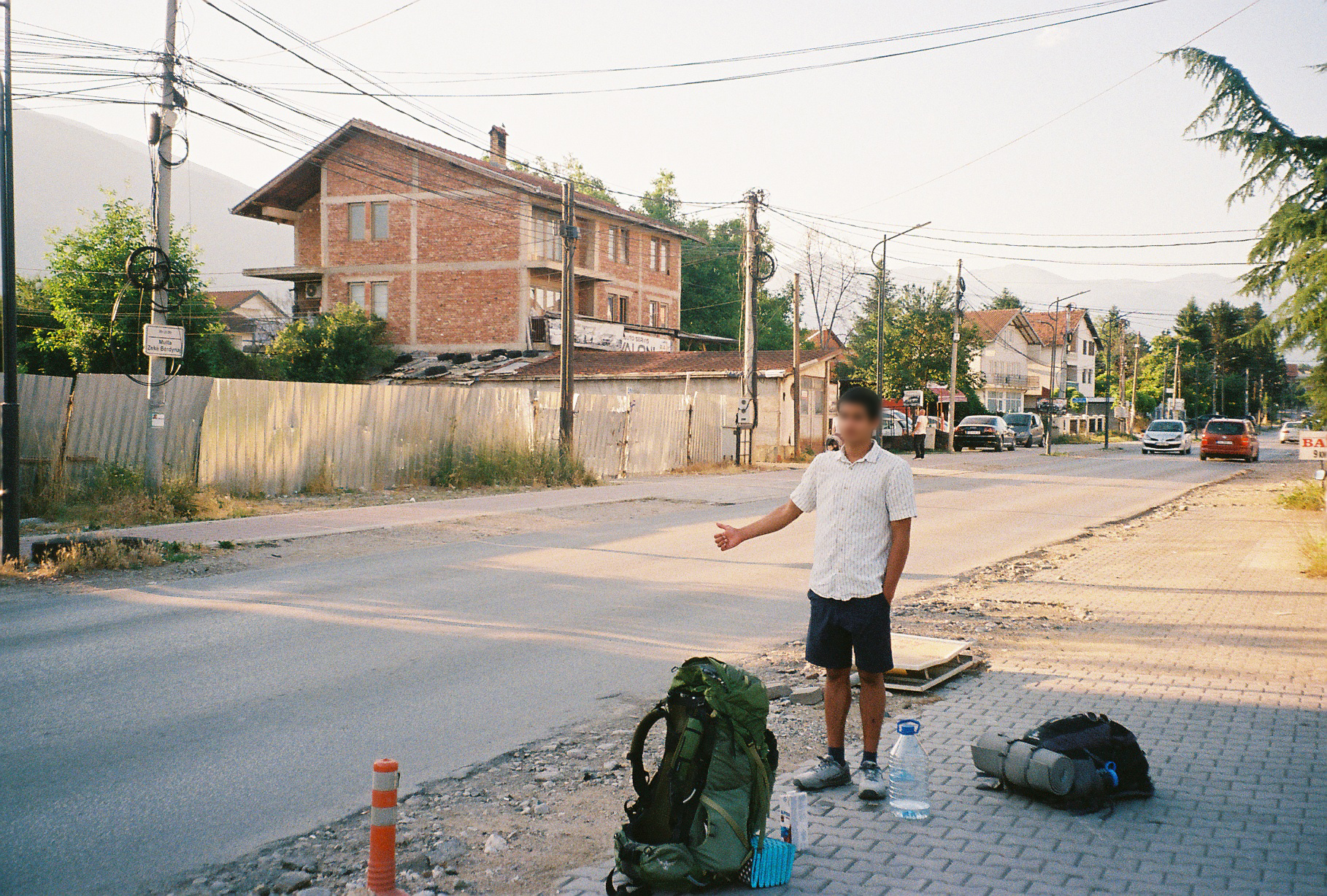
Hitchhiker traveling through Brestoviku, Kosovo.

- Asking for rides at gas stations instead of signaling at the roadside
- Refusing rides from alcohol impaired drivers
- Hitchhiking during daylight hours
- Trusting one's instincts
- Traveling with another hitchhiker; this measure decreases the likelihood of harm by a factor of six.

In the UK, The Scout Association specifically lists hitchhiking as an activity not permitted at any scouting event.

== Around the world ==
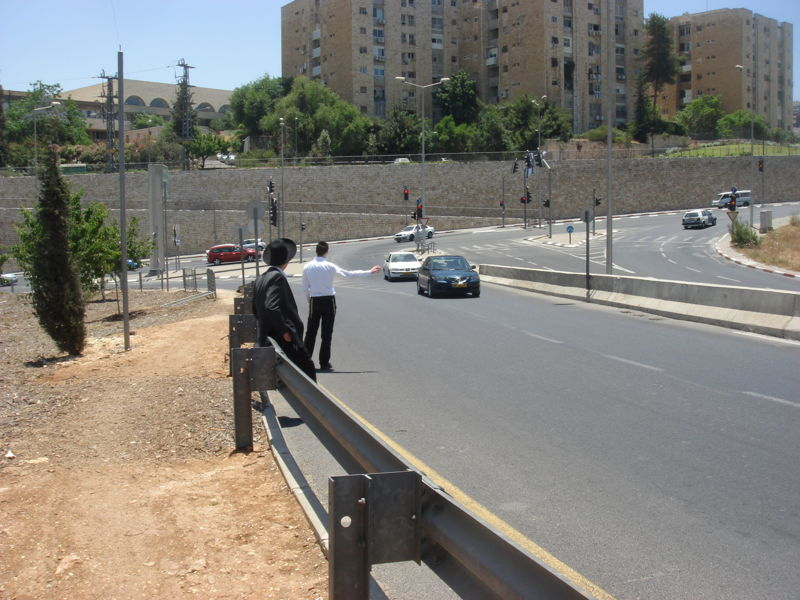
Trempests in Jerusalem

=== Cuba ===
In Cuba, picking up hitchhikers is mandatory for government vehicles, if passenger space is available. Hitchhiking is encouraged, as Cuba has few cars, and hitchhikers use designated spots. Drivers pick up waiting riders on a first come, first served basis.

=== Israel ===
In Israel, hitchhiking is commonplace at designated locations called trempiyadas (טרמפיאדה in Hebrew, derived from the German trampen). Travelers soliciting rides, called trempists, wait at trempiyadas, typically junctions of highways or main roads outside of a city.

=== Poland ===
Hitchhiking in Poland has a long history and is still popular. It was legalised and formalised in 1957 so hitchhikers could buy booklets including coupons from travel agencies. These coupons were given to drivers who took hitchhikers. By the end of each season drivers who collected the highest number of coupons could exchange them for prizes, and others took part in a lottery. This so-called "Akcja Autostop" was popular till the end of the 1970s, but the sale of the booklet was discontinued in 1995.

=== United States ===
Hitchhiking became a common method of traveling during the Great Depression and during the counterculture of the 1960s.

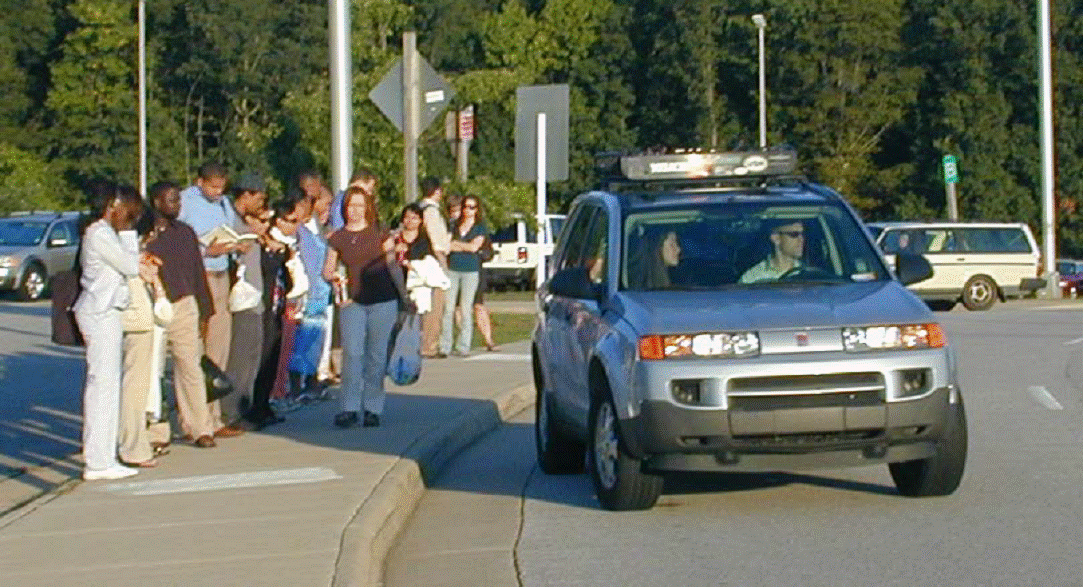
A "slug line" of passengers waiting for rides in the US

Warnings of the potential dangers of picking up hitchhikers were publicized to drivers, who were advised that some hitchhikers would rob drivers and, in some cases, sexually assault or murder them. Other warnings were publicized to the hitchhikers themselves, alerting them to the same types of crimes being carried out by drivers. Still, hitchhiking was part of the American psyche and many people continued to stick out their thumbs, even in states where the practice had been outlawed.

Today, hitchhiking is legal in 44 of the 50 states, the exceptions being Nevada, New Jersey, New York, Pennsylvania, Utah, and Wyoming. This is provided that the hitchhiker is not standing in the roadway or otherwise hindering the normal flow of traffic. Even in states where hitchhiking is illegal, hitchhikers are rarely ticketed. For example, the Wyoming Highway Patrol approached 524 hitchhikers in 2010, but only eight of them were cited.

== See also ==
- Murders of Jacqueline Ansell-Lamb and Barbara Mayo – two unsolved murders of hitchhikers in England in 1970
- Carpool
- Freighthopping
- Hitchwiki
- Ridesharing company
- Slugging – hitchhiking motivated by high-occupancy vehicle lanes in several urban areas

== Bibliography ==
- Brunvand, Harold (1981). The Vanishing Hitchhiker. American Urban Legends and Their Meaning. New York NY: Norton & Company.
- Griffin, John H. (1961). Black Like Me. Boston: Houghton Mifflin.
- Hawks, Tony (1996). Round Ireland with a Fridge. London: Ebury.
- Laviolette, Patrick (2016). Why did the anthropologist cross the road? Ethnos: Journal of Anthropology. 81(3): 379–401.
- Nwanna, Gladson I. (2004). Americans Traveling Abroad: What You Should Know Before You Go. Frontier Publishers. ISBN 1890605107.
- Packer, Jeremy (2008). Hitching the highway to hell: Media hysterics and the politics of youth mobility. Mobility Without Mayhem: Safety, Cars, and Citizenship. Chapel Hill: Duke Univ. Press (77–110).
- Reid, Jack. (2020) Roadside Americans: The Rise and Fall of Hitchhiking in a Changing Nation. Chapel Hill: Univ, of North Carolina Press.
- Smith, David H. & Frauke Zeller (2017). The death and lives of hitchBOT: the design and implementation of a hitchhiking robot. Leonardo. 50(1): 77–8.
- Sykes, Simon & Tom Sykes (2005). No Such Thing as a Free Ride. UK Edition. London: Cassell Illustrated.
- Tobar, Héctor (2020). The Last Great Road Bum. New York: Farrar, Straus and Giroux.
- Kabourkova, Michaela (2022). Solo Female Traveller: What I Learnt from Hitchhiking in 70 Countries. Valencia: Amazon.
