= Slugging =

Informal carpools for commuting

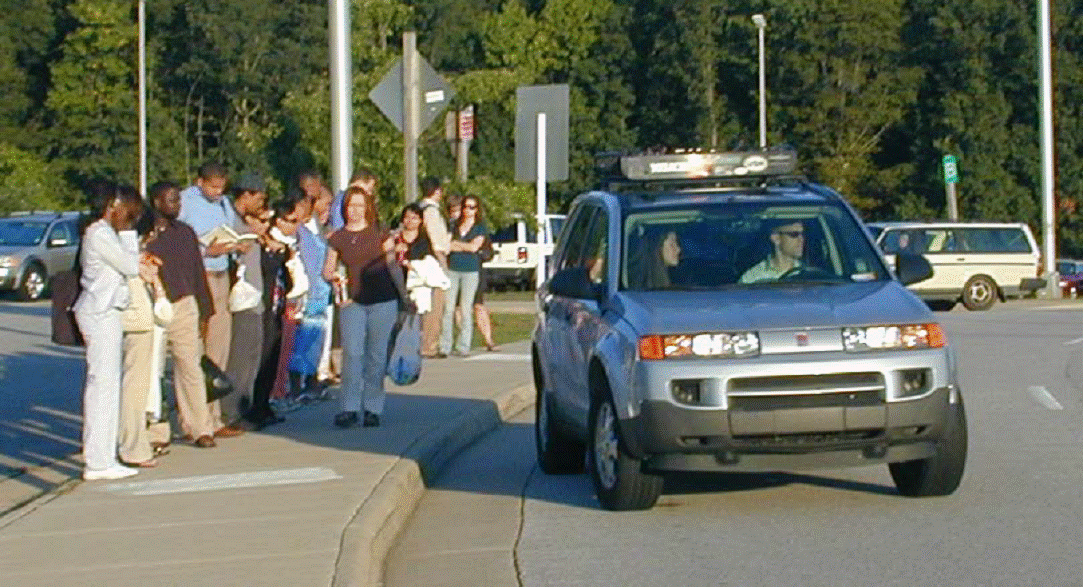
A "slug line" of passengers waiting for rides

Slugging, also known as casual carpooling and flexible carpooling, is the practice of forming ad hoc, informal carpools for purposes of commuting, essentially a variation of hitchhiking. A driver picks up these non-paying passengers (known as "slugs" or "sluggers") at key locations, as having these additional passengers means that the driver can qualify to use an HOV lane or not be subject to road pricing. Slugging is common mostly in the U.S., specifically in major cities such as the Washington metropolitan area, San Francisco, Houston.

The essence of the systems is the use of a meeting-place to form carpools, without any advance contact between the participants. For people wishing to carpool, going to a meeting place is a very low-effort method for getting into a carpool, compared with any other system that involves contacting potential riders or drivers in advance, and arranging the trip. The key is that other people are also coming to the meeting place, and there need to be sufficient people traveling from any one meeting-place to the common destination so that the waiting time to form a carpool is acceptable.

Slug lines are generally organized and maintained by volunteers, although there has been government involvement in organization as well.

== Background ==
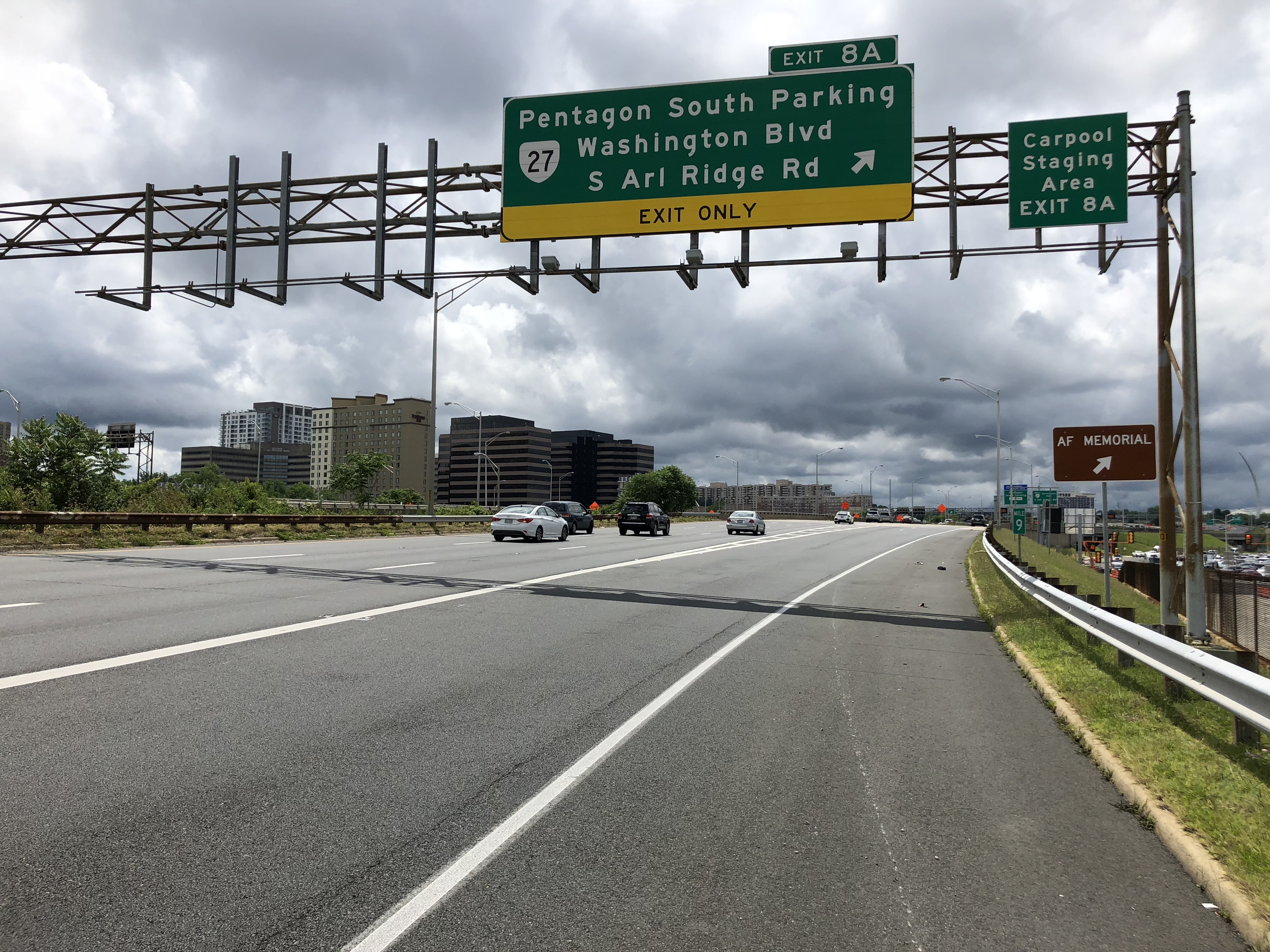
Various sites in Northern Virginia are designated as "carpool staging areas", that is, slug lines.

In order to relieve traffic volume during the morning and evening rush hours, high-occupancy vehicle lanes that require more than one person per automobile were introduced in many major American cities to encourage carpooling and greater use of public transport, first appearing in the Washington D.C. Metropolitan Area in 1975.

The failure of the new lanes to relieve congestion, as well as frustration over failures of public-transport systems and high fuel prices, led to the creation in the 1970s of "slugging", a form of hitchhiking between strangers that is beneficial to both parties, as drivers and passengers are able to use the HOV lane for a quicker trip. While passengers are able to travel for free, or cheaper than via other modes of travel, and HOV drivers sometimes pay no tolls, "slugs are, above all, motivated by time saved, not money pocketed". Concern for the environment is not their primary motivation.

In the Washington area, slugging occurs on Interstates 95, 66 and 395 between Washington and Northern Virginia. Slugging is said to work well in Washington because it is a "unique mix of a small city center, clogged highway arteries, and expensive toll roads".

In the San Francisco Bay Area, casual carpooling occurs on Interstate 80 between the East Bay and San Francisco. Usage was slow to recover after the COVID-19 pandemic. Several smartphone apps have been developed.

Slugging also occurs in Houston, and in Pittsburgh.

Slugging is shown to be effective in reducing vehicle travel distance as a form of ridesharing.

Slugging is more used during morning commutes than evening commutes. The most common mode that slugging replaces is the transit bus.

David D. Friedman's The Machinery of Freedom proposed a similar system (which he referred to as "jitney transit") in the 1970s. However, his plan assumed that passengers would be expected to pay for their transit, and that security measures such as electronic identification cards (recording the identity of both driver and passenger in a database readily available to police, in the event one or both parties disappeared) would be needed in order for people to feel safe.

Although slugging is informal, ad hoc, and free, for 30 years no violence or crime was reported from Washington D.C. slugging until October 2010, when former Sergeant Major of the Army Gene McKinney struck one of his passengers with his car after they threatened to report his reckless driving to the police.

== Etymology ==
The term slug (used as both a noun and a verb) came from bus drivers who had to determine if the people waiting at the stop were genuine bus passengers or merely people wanting a free lift, in the same way that they look out for fake coins—or "slugs"—being thrown into the fare-collection box.

== General practices ==
In practice, slugging involves the creation of free, unofficial ad hoc carpool networks, often with published routes and pick-up and drop-off locations. In the morning, sluggers gather at local businesses and at government-run locations such as park and ride-like facilities or bus stops and subway stations with lines of sluggers. Drivers pull up to the queue for the route they will follow and either display a sign or call out the designated drop-off point they are willing to drive to and how many passengers they can take; in the Washington area the Pentagon—the largest place of employment in the United States, with 25,000 workers—is a popular destination. Enough riders fill the car and the driver departs. In the evening, the routes reverse.

Many unofficial rules of etiquette exist, and websites allow sluggers to post warnings about those who break them. These include:

- The slug first in line gets the next ride to their destination and also gets to choose the front or back seat. Slugs should never take a ride out of turn.
- Drivers are not to pick up sluggers en-route to or standing outside the line, a practice referred to as "body snatching".
- A woman is not to be left in the line alone, for her safety.
- No eating, smoking, or putting on of makeup is allowed.
- The driver has full control of the radio and climate controls.
- Windows may not be opened unless the driver approves.
- No money is exchanged or requested, as the driver and slugs all benefit from slugging.
- Driver and passengers say "Thank you" at the end.

== Other examples ==
In France, spontaneous carpool lines have been established in rural municipalities by Ecov using electronic signs and smartphone apps to alert drivers of waiting riders.

In Jakarta, "car jockeys" had been paid by commuters to ride into the center of the city to permit the use of high-occupancy vehicle lanes until the lanes were eliminated in 2017.

From 1979 to 1980, Marin County, California, implemented a flexible carpooling system using as meeting points several major intersections near bus stops.

In 2009, the Washington State Legislature set aside $400,000 for a pilot project to test meeting-place based carpooling in the SR 520 corridor of Seattle incorporating the Avego smartphone ridematching system.

In 2010, the Auckland Regional Transport Authority considered a flexible carpooling proposal by Trip Convergence Ltd.

In India, it is illegal for drivers to randomly pick up commuters from the public roads and there is evidence that such drivers have been fined.

In the Polish People's Republic, hitchhiking was officially supported by the government (and formalized), and in Cuba, government vehicles are obligated to take hitchhikers, but these systems have nothing to do with high-occupancy lanes.

== See also ==
- Ride-sharing bench
- Ridesharing company
