= Hitchwiki =

Wiki on hitchhiking

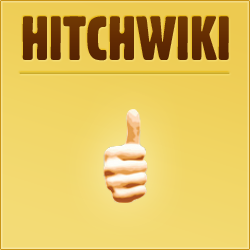
- Website type: Wiki
- Available in: English, German, Spanish, French, Finnish, Portuguese, Bulgarian, Russian, Chinese, Polish, Turkish, Romanian, Dutch, Hebrew.
- Owner: The copyright of the content is owned by the individual authors
- Website: hitchwiki.org
- Commercial: no
- Launched: April 14, 2005 / November 2006
- Current status: active

Hitchwiki is a collaborative project to build a free guide for hitchhikers. It is an international exchange for information about hitchhiking in many countries, and contains specific tips for hitchhiking out of the large cities, as well as general information about equipment, safety and strategies for effective hitchhiking. The project maintains a map of rated hitchhiking spots as well at hitchmap.com. There are also personal profiles of the hitchhikers, travel stories, photos, blogs and discussion forums. According to the Guardian, it is part of an "internet-fueled revival" of hitchhiking.

The project was started on April 14, 2005, abandoned for a while and then moved to Wikia. In November 2006, it was moved to hitchwiki.org and relaunched as Hitchwiki; at the same time, versions of it in other languages were started. As of March 2025 there are 4,168 articles on the English language Hitchwiki, while the site is also available in other languages, notably German, which had 1233 articles, but also smaller wikis in Spanish, French, Finnish, Portuguese, Bulgarian, Russian, Hebrew, Dutch, Polish, Romanian, Turkish and Chinese. The website makes use of MediaWiki, WordPress and BuddyPress and allows anonymous edits. Database dumps of the articles are available for download.
