= Ride-sharing bench =

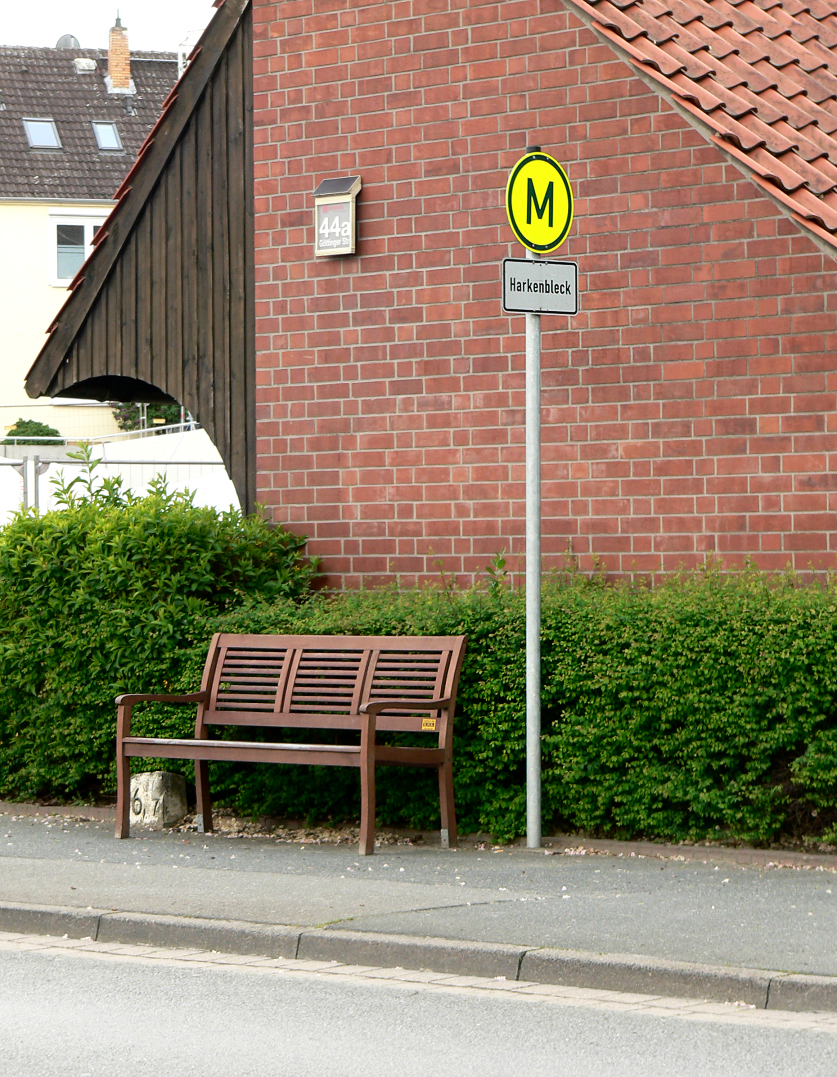
Ride-sharing bench in Arnum

A ride-sharing bench (usually referred to in Switzerland as 'Mitfahrbänkli') is a public bench with a particular purpose: a person who sits on this bench signals that they want to hitch a spontaneous, free ride in a passenger car to a certain destination.

== Description ==
Since the mid-2010s, an increasing number of ride-sharing benches have been installed in German cities and communities. In areas or times with infrequent public transport, this aims to improve the mobility of people without cars (young people, the elderly, etc.). Better networking between districts and the capital district is also an incentive for communities to adopt this concept. As part of a new mobility concept, the ride-sharing benches should also contribute to the protection of the environment, as many vehicles are often occupied by just one driver. The European Union encourages these types of projects in rural areas through their LEADER action programme.

The benches are made from wood or metal, and are usually placed on streets with high by-traffic and near bus stops or lay-bys. They are characterised by a noticeable colour and signage, which can vary from place to place.

At some locations, large fold-out or slide-out signs with place names make it possible to clearly signal the desired destination to approaching motorists. In the district of Tuttlingen, an App for smartphones was developed, with which the locations of the ride-sharing benches in the area can be retrieved.

There are also numerous ride-sharing benches in Austria, especially in Lower Austria and Tyrol. The Austrian Ministry of Agriculture, Regions and Tourism promotes the introduction of ride-sharing benches as part of its climate protection initiative klimaaktiv. The Tyrolean network MobilitäterInnen, initiated by Carmen Brucic, published a Handbook for a successful introduction of ride-sharing benches in 2018.

Ride-sharing benches have also been placed in the German-speaking Community of Belgium.

== Photo Gallery ==
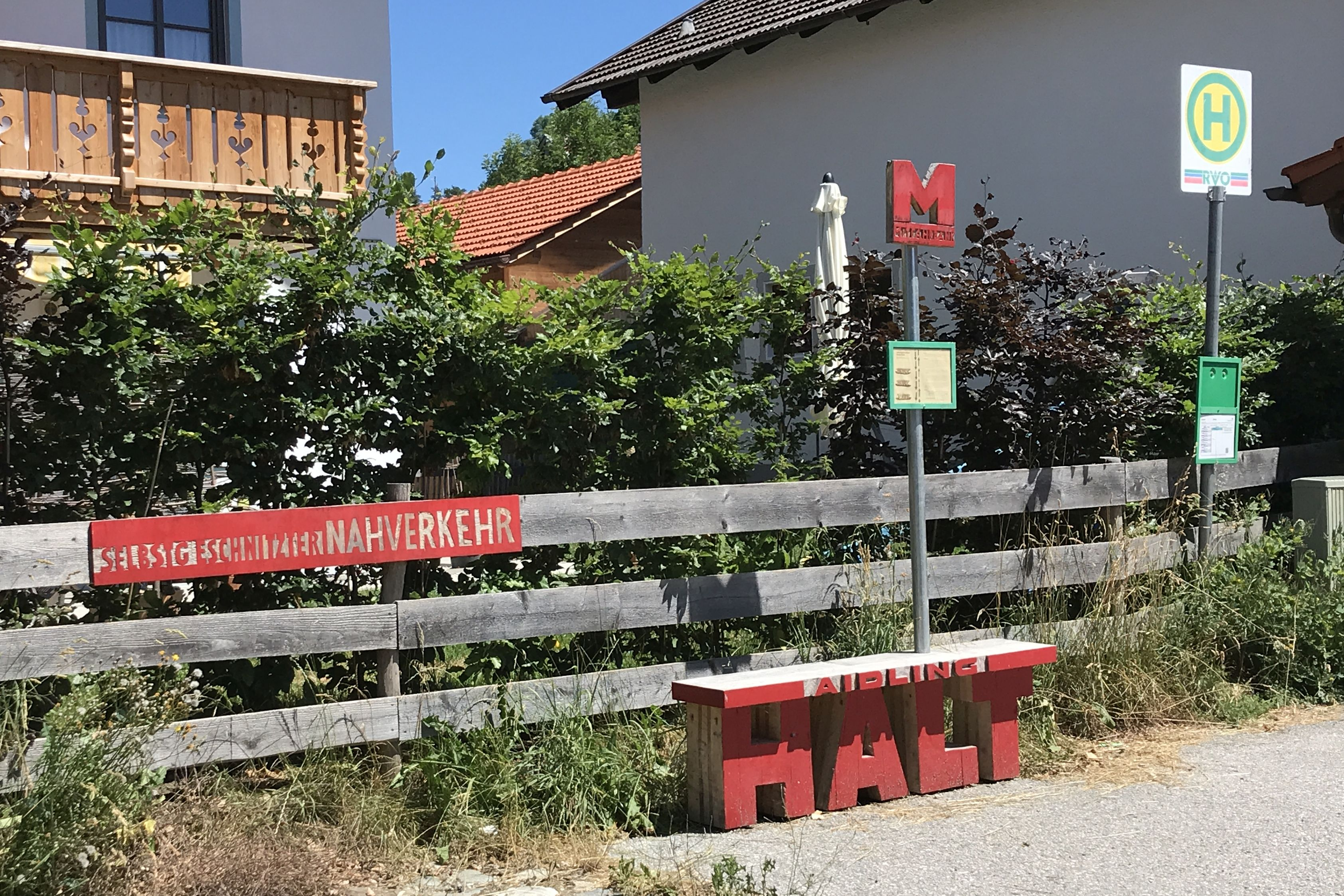
Ride-sharing bench of the 'home-made local transport' in Aidling

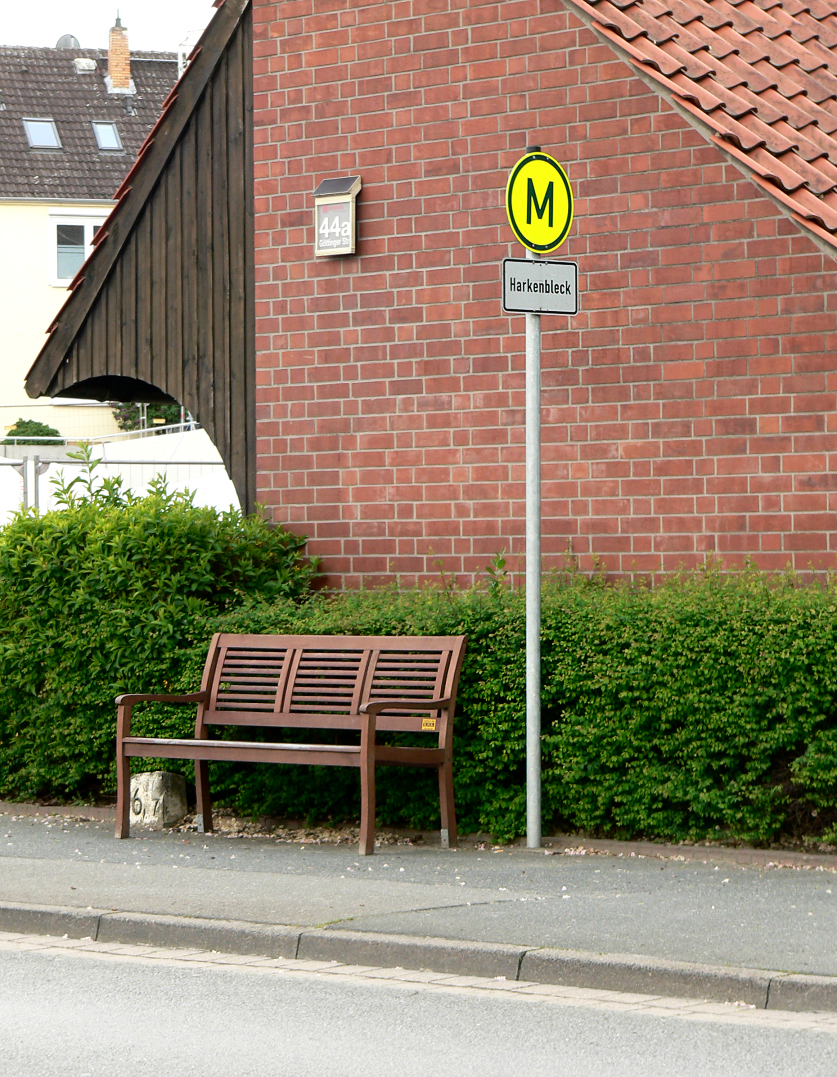
Ride-sharing bench in Arnum

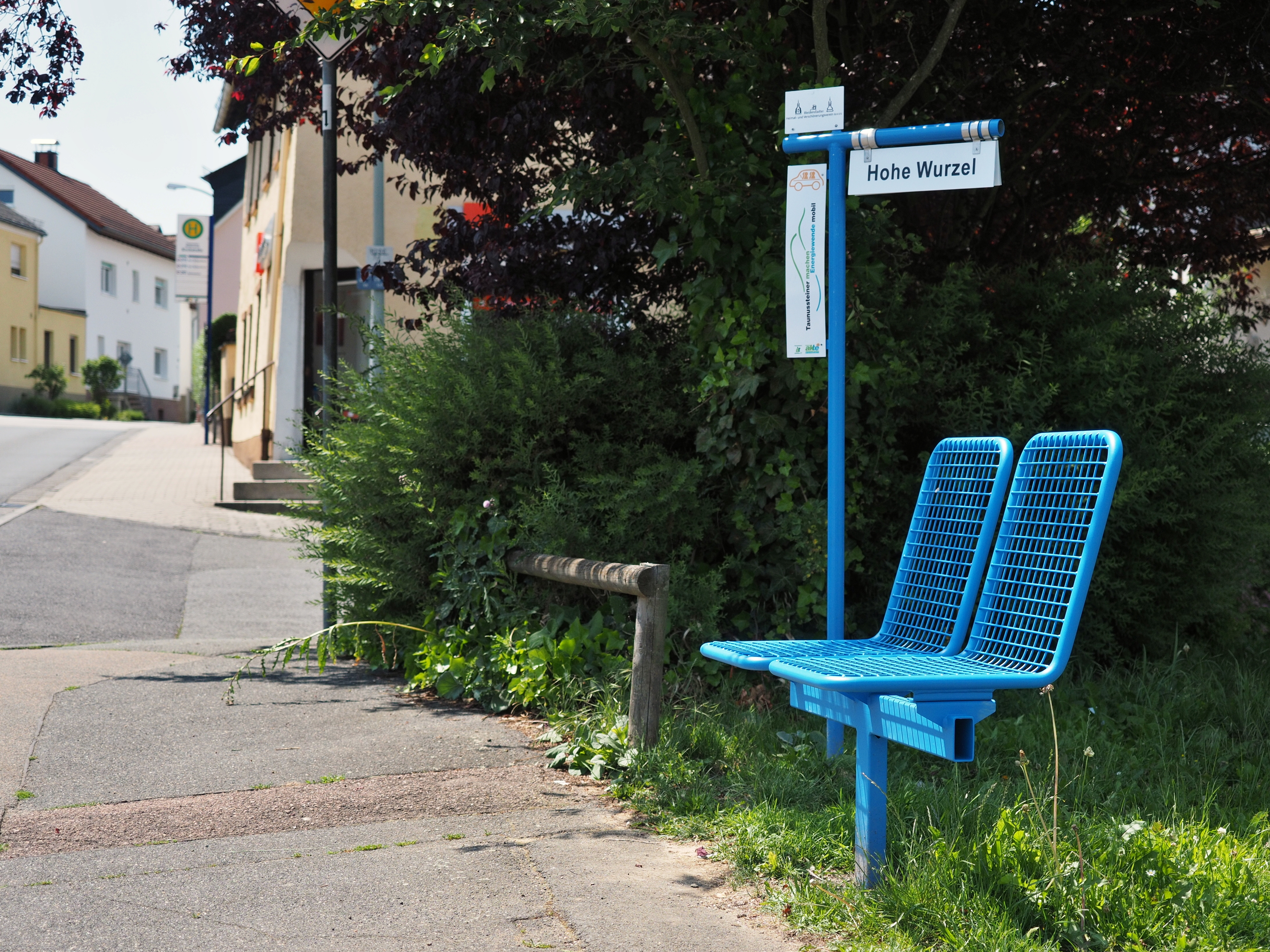
Ride-sharing bench in Bleidenstadt

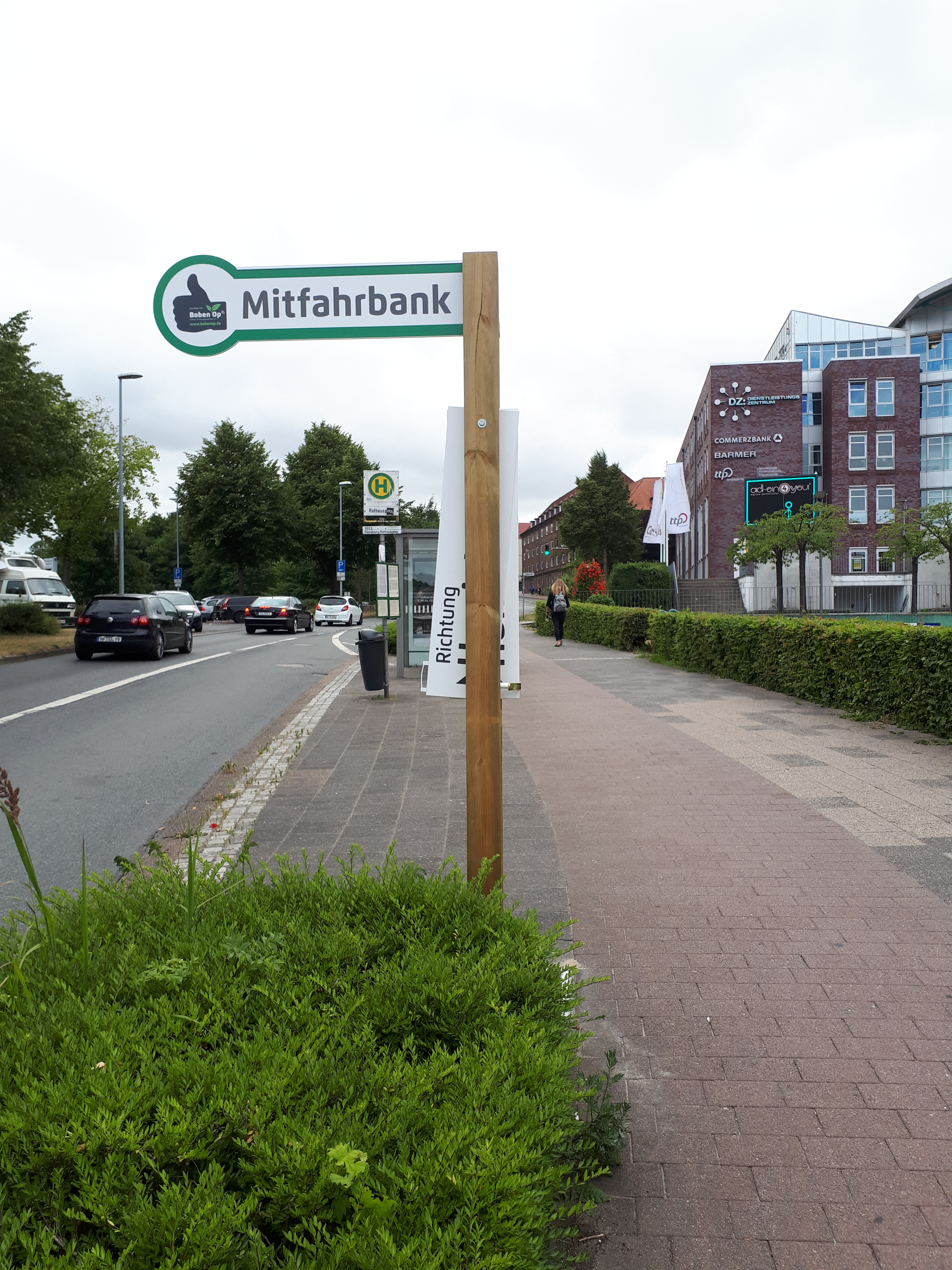
Ride-sharing bench in Flensburg

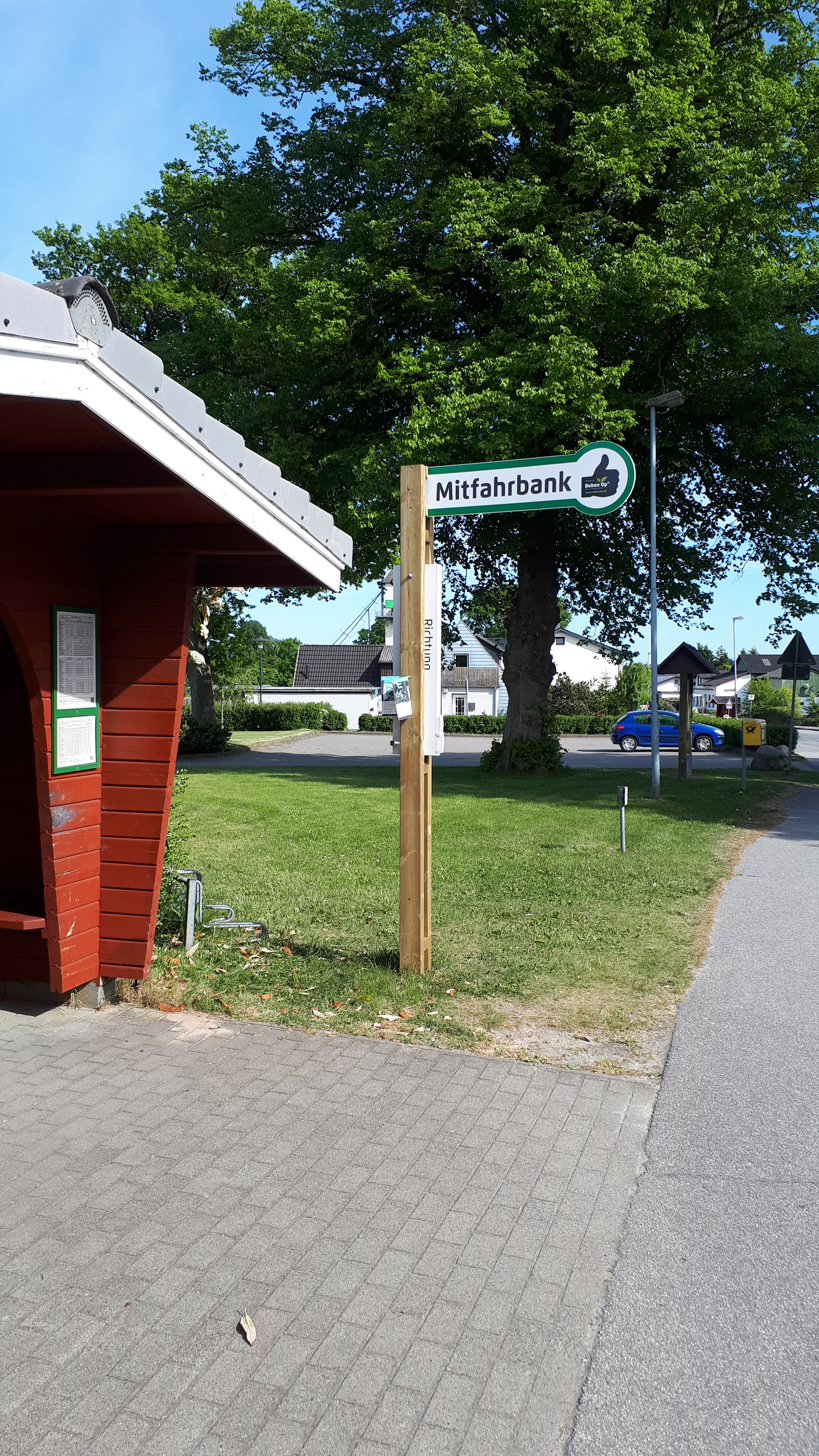
Ride-sharing bench in Freienwill

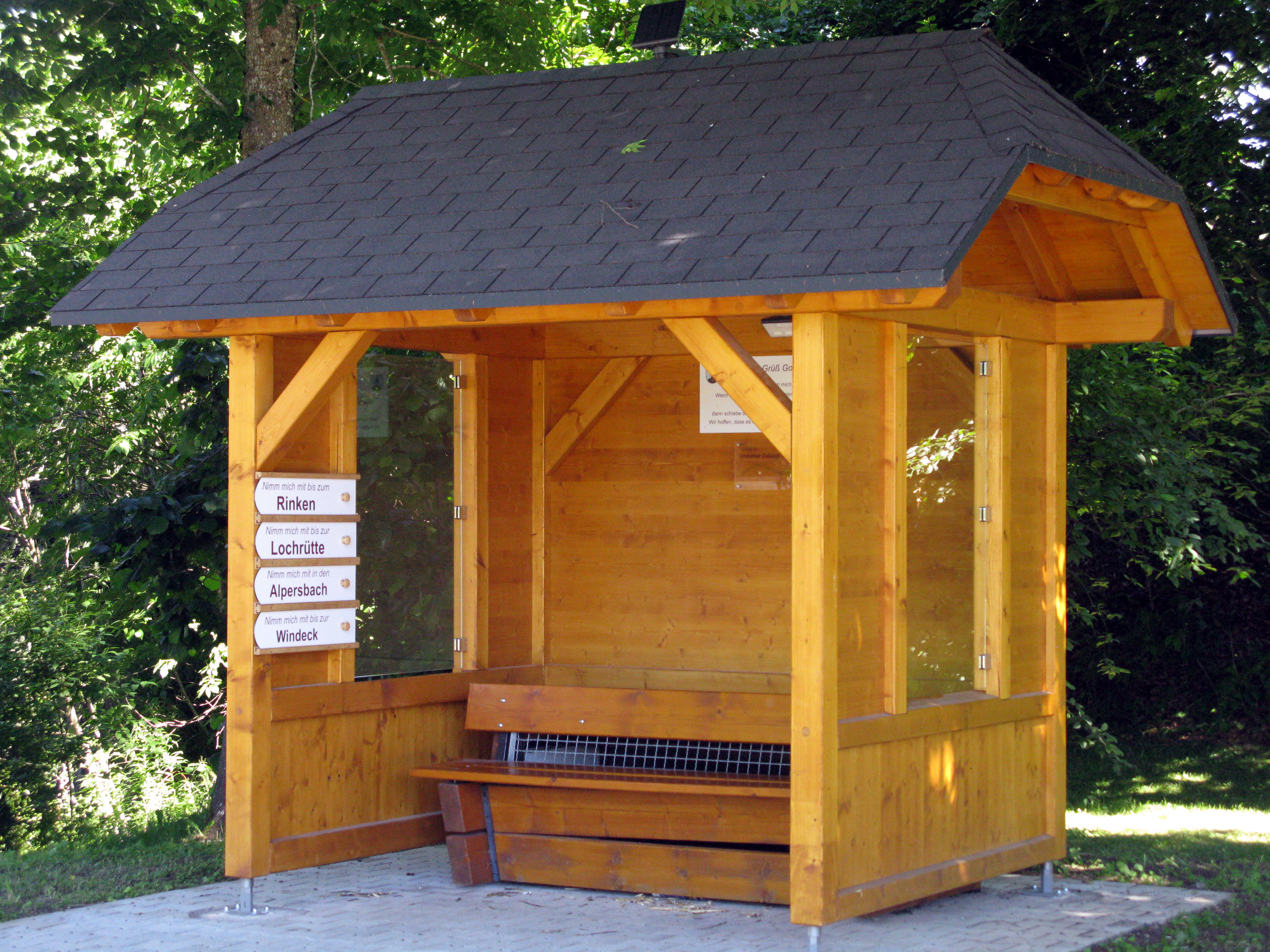
Take-me-with hut in Hinterzarten

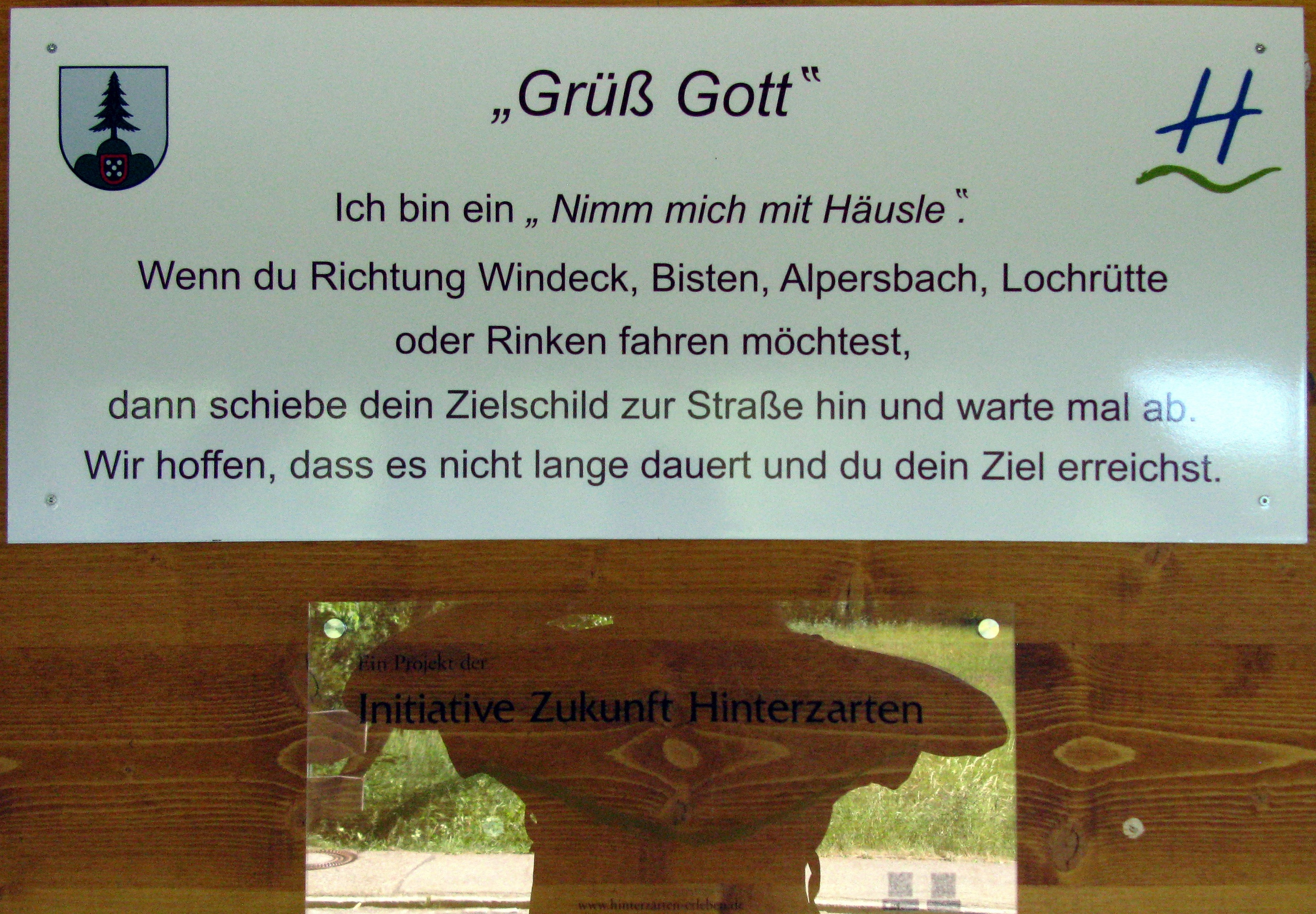
Board with explanations at the Take-me-with hut in Hinterzarten

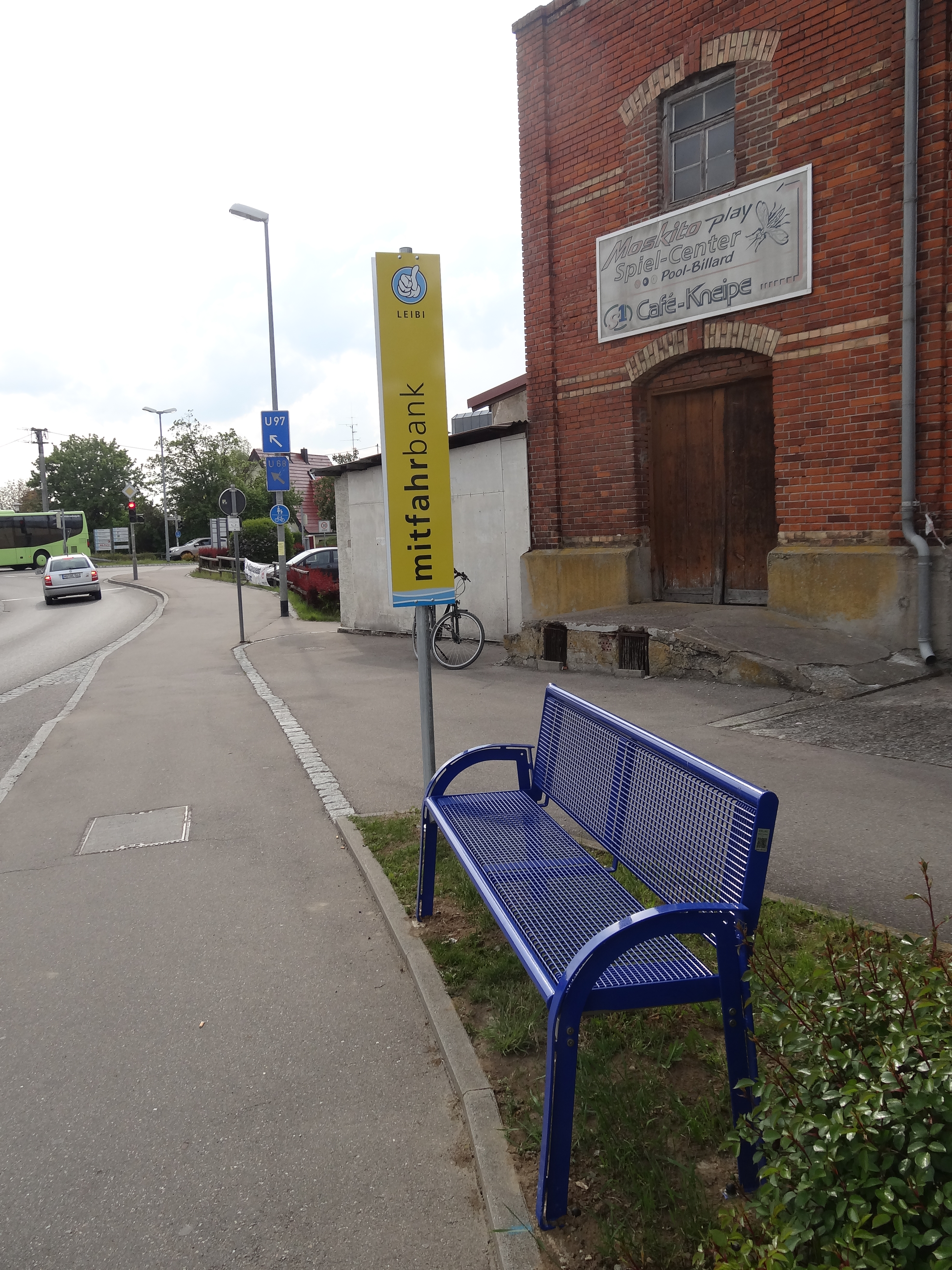
Ride-sharing bench in Nersingen

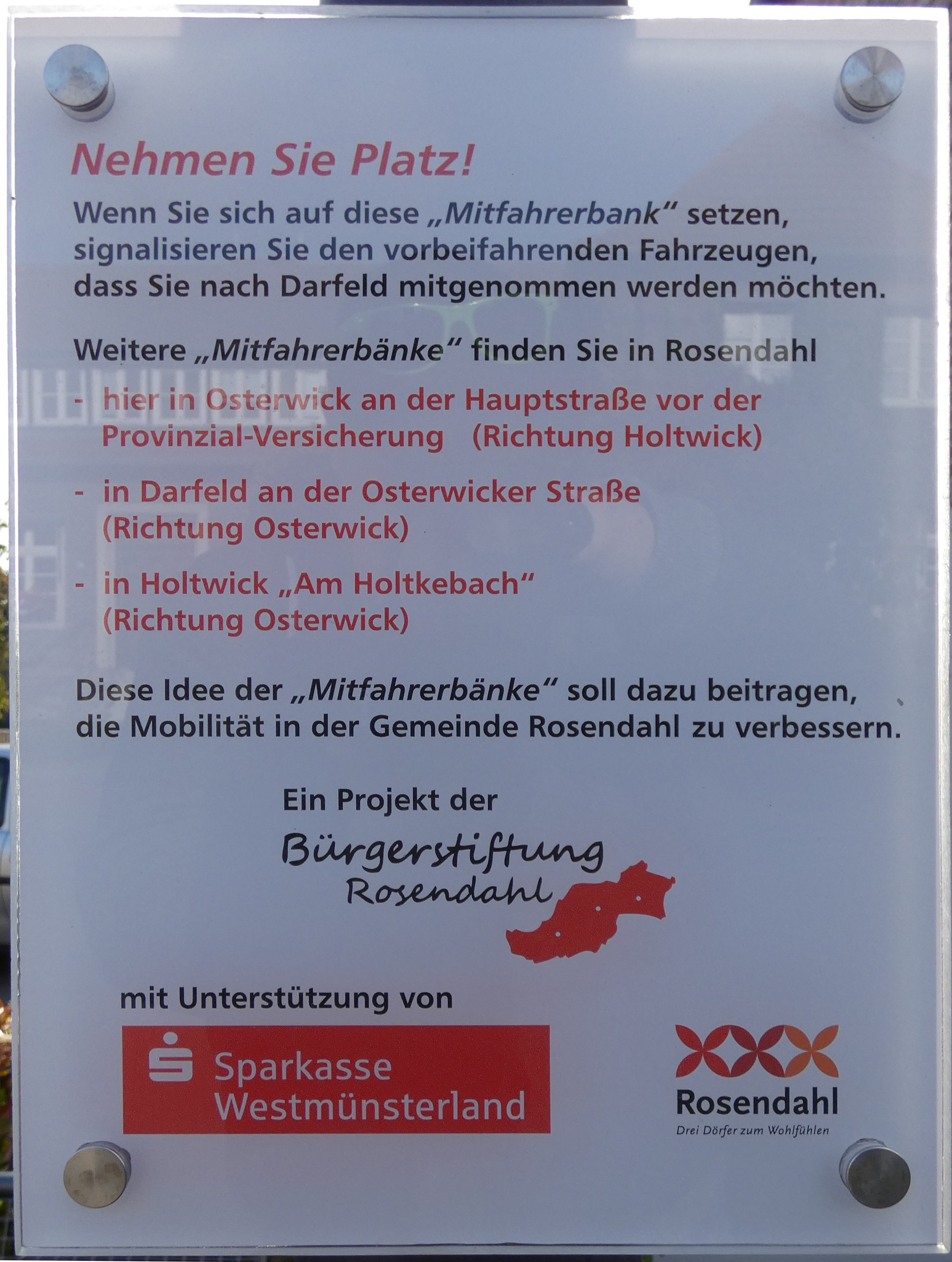
In Osterwick explanations are also provided.

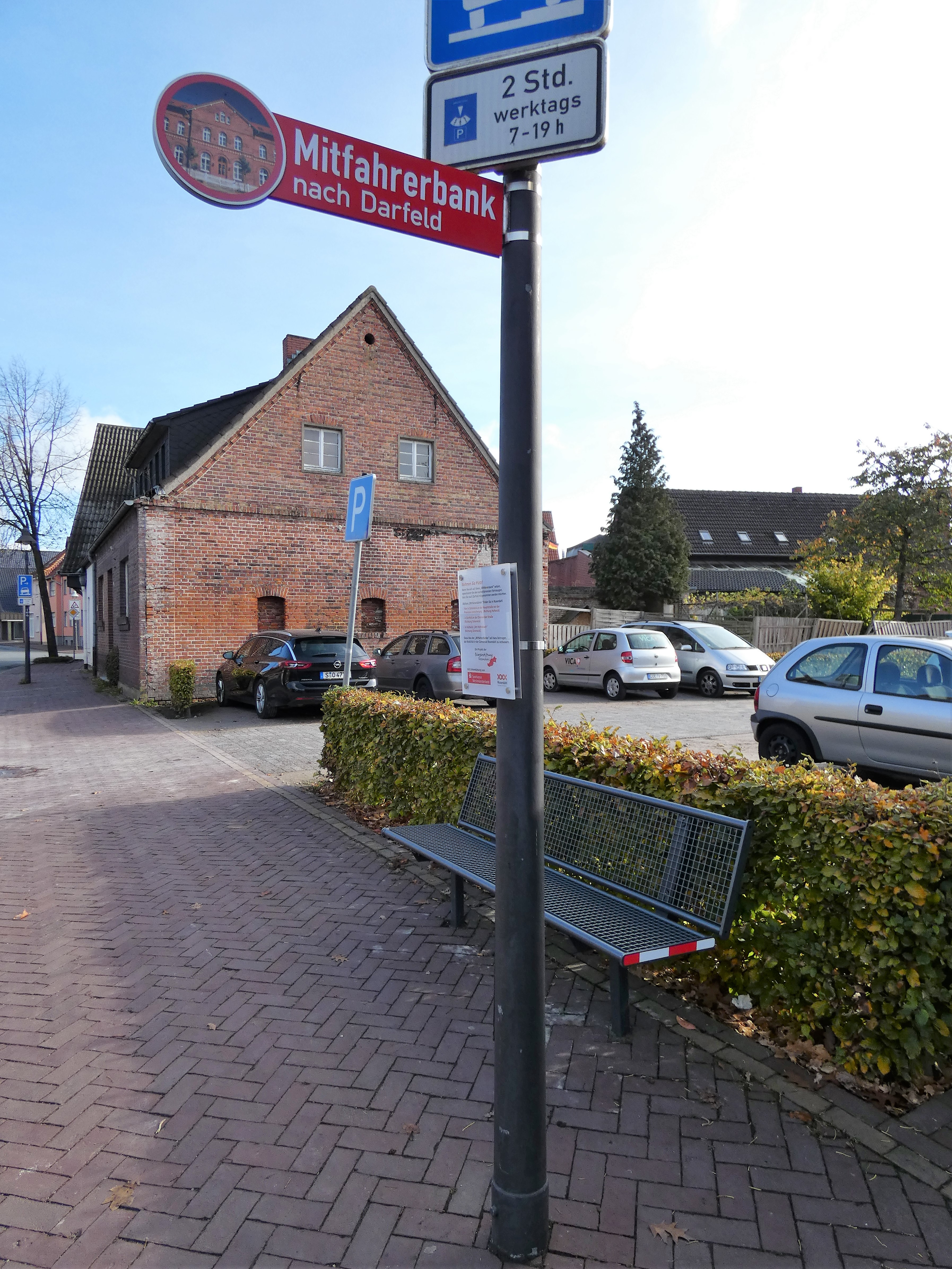
Ride-sharing bench in Rosendahl-Osterwick

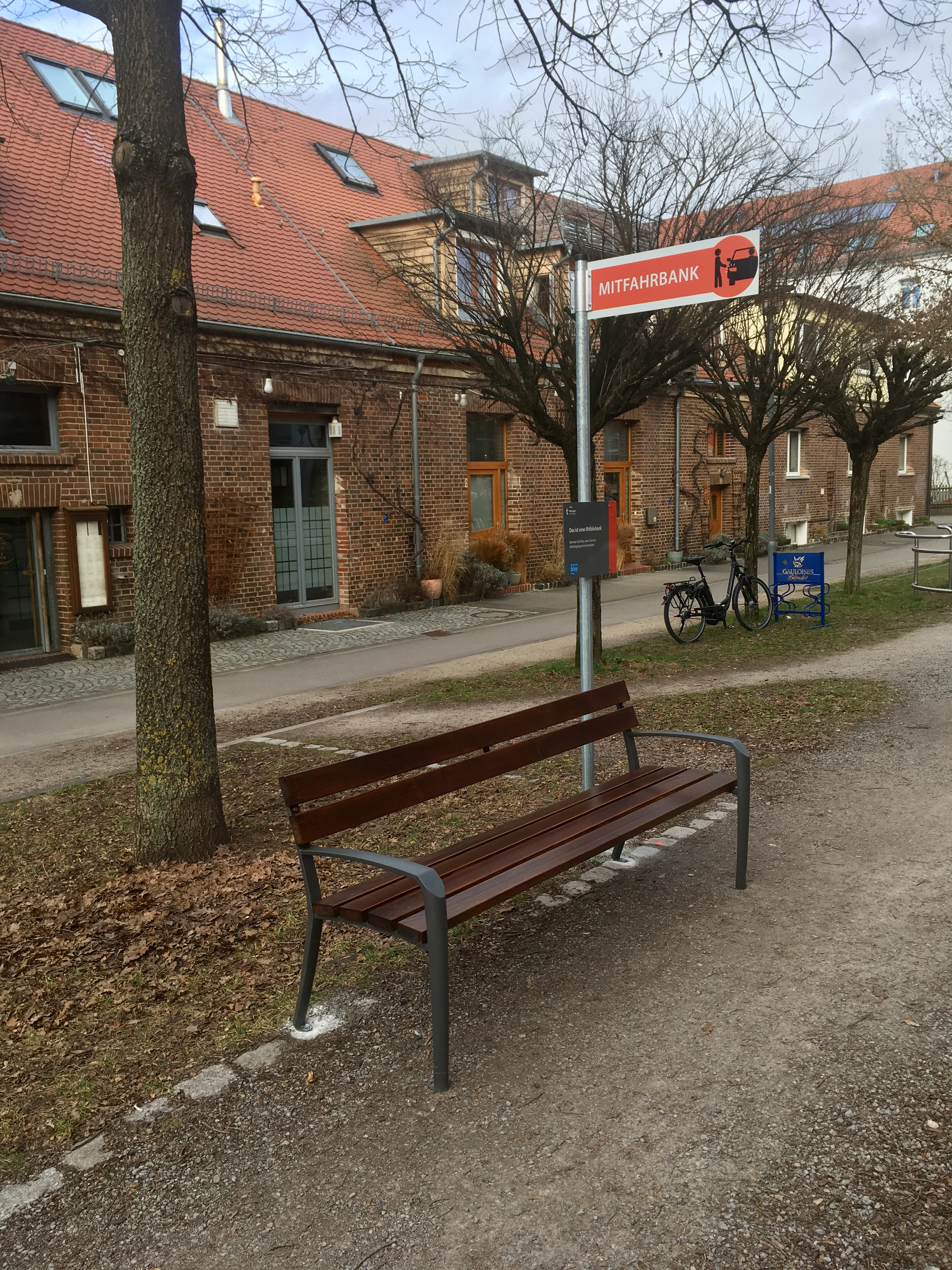
Ride-sharing bench in Tübingen

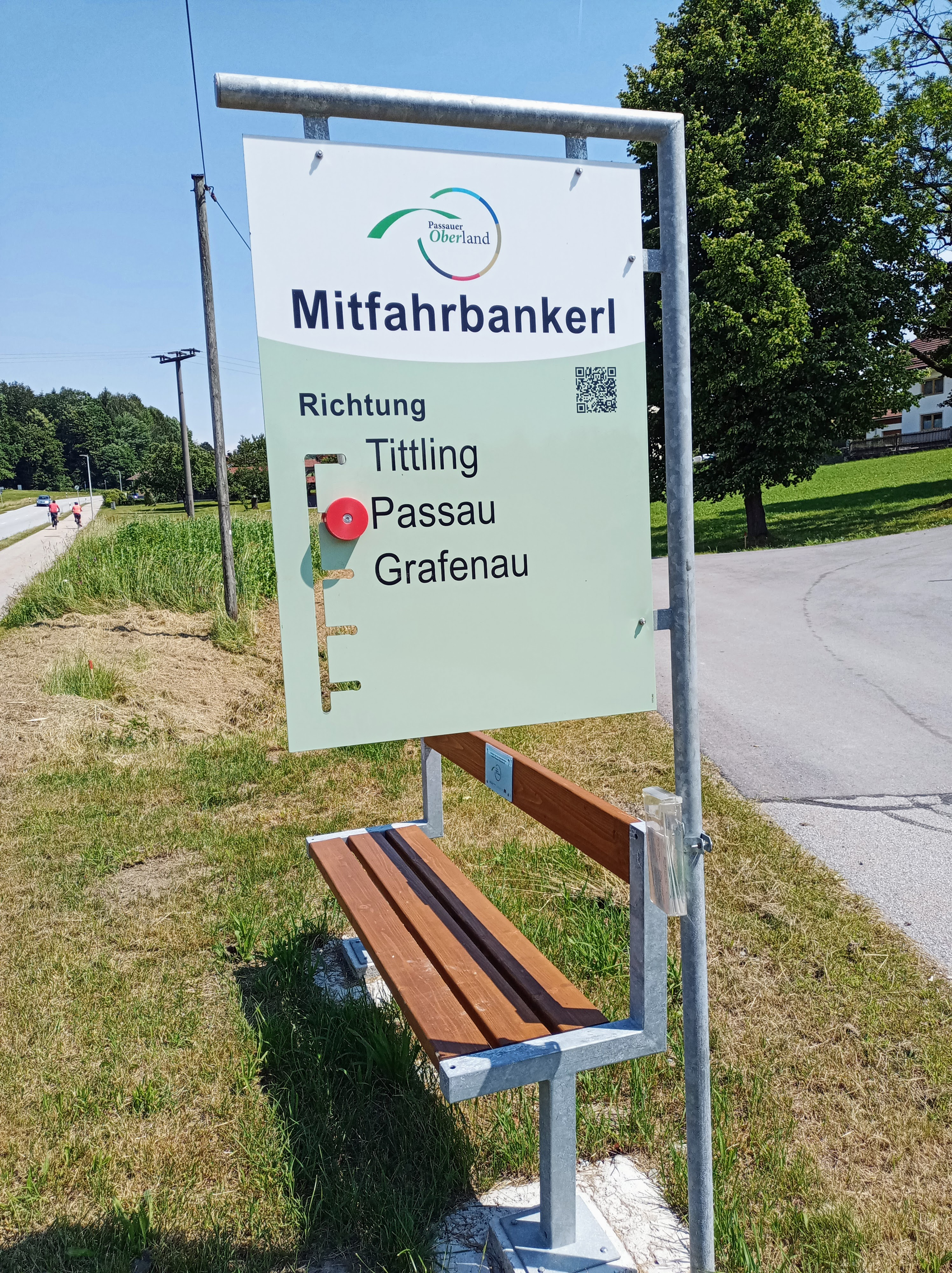
Ride-sharing bench near Rothau in the Bavarian Forest with the option of selecting the desired direction of travel.

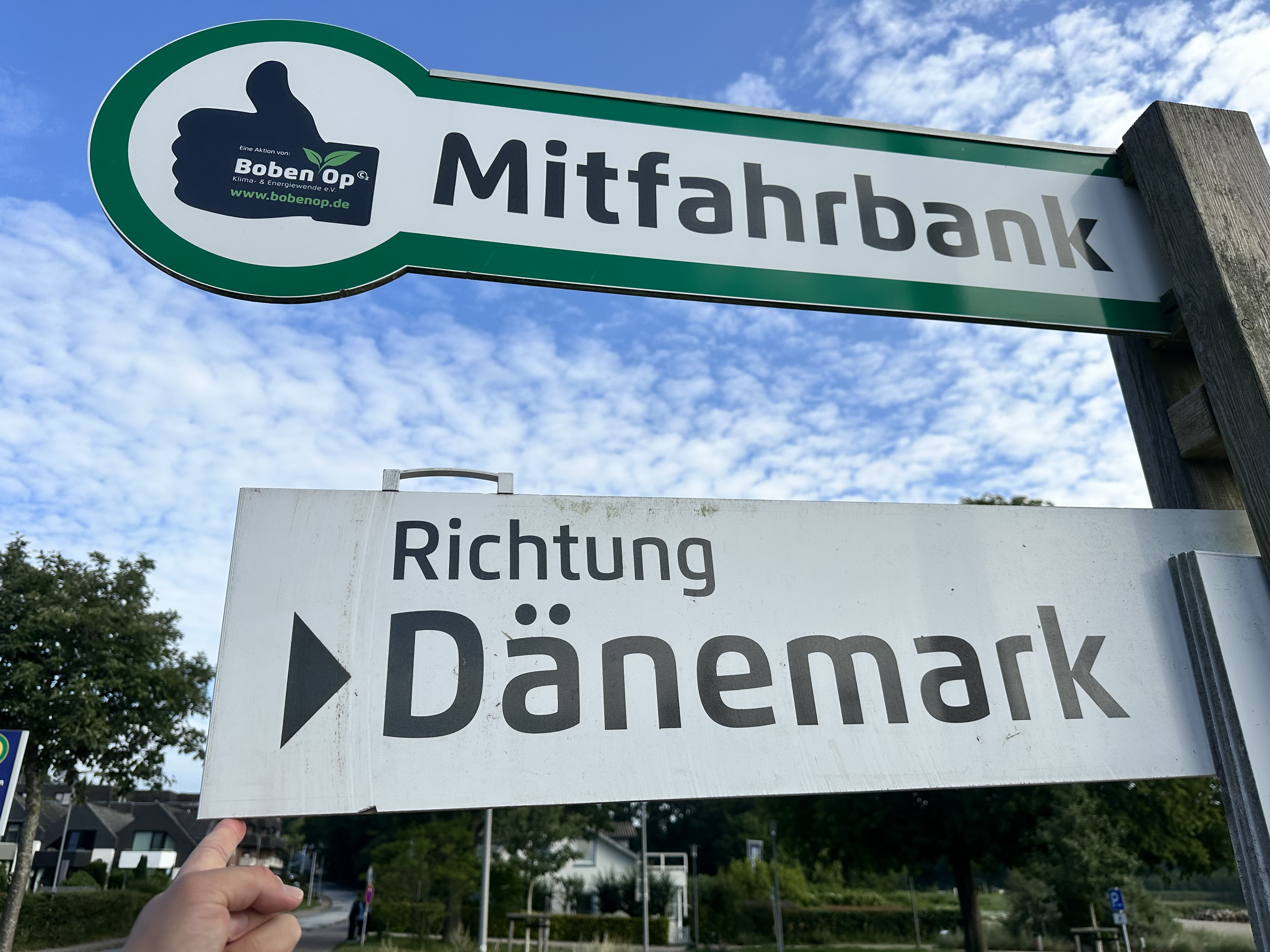
Ride-sharing point in Wassersleben

== See also ==
- Flexible carpooling
- Slugging
