= Wikia Search =

Defunct free and open-source web search engine by Wikia

- The Wikia Search homepage in Firefox
- Website type: Search engine
- Available in: English and multiple translations
- Owner: Wikia Inc.
- Creator: Jimmy Wales
- Website: search.wikia.com
- Commercial: Yes
- Registration: Optional
- Launched: January 7, 2008; 18 years ago
- Current status: Closed

Wikia Search was a short-lived free and open-source web search engine launched by Wikia, a for-profit wiki-hosting company founded by Jimmy Wales and Angela Beesley. Wikia Search followed other experiments by Wikia into search engine technology and officially launched as a "public alpha" on January 7, 2008. The roll-out version of the search interface was widely criticized by reviewers in mainstream media. The second version released in June 2008 received a warmer reception by some former critics. The project ended in the spring of 2009 due to low usage, poor economic conditions and Wikia's stated desire to focus on the more popular Wikianswers.

== History ==
On December 23, 2006, Wales made a passing comment regarding the possibility of a wiki-based internet search. The result was extensive media coverage in multiple languages, in outlets like The Guardian, the Sydney Morning Herald, and online editions of Forbes and Business Week publishing the statement as an announcement, encouraging the company to re-brand and relaunch its previous search engine proposal under the temporary name of "Search Wikia". In a later interview, Wales attempted to clarify several issues. He said that funding received from Amazon.com was not specific to the search project and also restated that Wikia and Wikipedia have separate management, even though they shared three key stakeholders. When asked whether the project was "formally announced", he said it was partly planned and partly a response to news coverage.

On January 31, 2007, at a talk given at New York University, Wales announced that Wikia plans to build a search engine rivaling those of Google and Yahoo based on the kind of collaborative cooperation which has been so successful in developing Wikipedia, arguing that "search should be open, transparent, participatory, and democratic." He later suggested this new approach could account for five percent of the search market. On March 10, 2007, Gil Penchina, chief executive officer of Wikia, stated in an interview that the goal for the project is to get five percent of the search market and that a release date for services was not scheduled. "We're really trying to build a movement to make search free and open and transparent," Penchina said. "We have some servers up and people are hacking away." The free and open-source approach of utilizing programmers and users around the world is different from that used by major search providers such as Google and Yahoo, who keep most of their code secret, and could provide a search engine that lets users edit and fine tune its results. Wikia acquired the search index tool Grub in 2007.

On December 24, 2007, Wales announced that Wikia Search had entered "private pre-alpha".

By the public alpha launch on January 7, 2008, Wikia Search had indexed 30 million pages. The roll-out version of the search interface was widely criticized by reviewers in mainstream media.

On June 3, 2008, an upgraded version of Wikia Search was released with additional features such as improved screen display and facilities for users to rate, edit and enhance the search results, including through a star ranking system. In particular, it offered users the possibility of adding pertinent URLs to the results displayed and deleting any misleading results with immediate effect. The improvements were welcomed by some of the former critics and praised as a "promising approach" by David Chartier at Ars Technica.

In August 2008 Wikia Search launched an official version of the Wikia toolbar that can be downloaded and added on to the Firefox browser. In October 2008, WISE – Wikia Intelligent Search Extensions was released.

By August 2008, Wikia Search held a 0.000079% share of the search market in the U.S., compared with Google's 70.77%. While Google was conducting experiments with page ranking based on user feedback around this time, Jimmy Wales stated that Google's random tests and its closed algorithm were different from the open, community-oriented crowdsourcing attempts of Wikia Search.

In November 2008, Google launched 'SearchWiki' in a response to Wikia Search and Microsoft's URank.

In March 2009, Wales announced the end of the project. "... Wikia Search was not making its numbers. With only 10,000 unique users a month over the past six months, Wales said, it was hard to justify the resources being put into it." Wales mentioned the difficulty of raising money given the state of the economy and that Wikia would focus on more successful project like Wikianswers.

Finally on May 14, 2009, the search engine service was brought to a halt. Queries to the Wikia Search website were redirected, with a message in part stating "The Wikia Search project has ended."

== Search engine ==
=== Features ===
The search engine's result pages provided access to three major components:

- a web search engine,
- a social network service and
- a wiki, which hosts so-called mini-articles

==== Mini-articles ====
A prominent feature of the search engine were the human-written mini articles. Mini articles were short articles about the topics given by their title. They were hosted by a Wikia wiki.

Whenever a search query is issued with mini in front, the results page looked in the wiki for a mini article with a name that matched the search query. If no matching article existed, the search user was given the opportunity to write a new one.

==== Social network ====
The user interface was tied in with a social network application, called "foowi". Users could create an account for the application and fill in a profile. The system linked the wiki login to the social network login. Profile functions include Status, Basic profile, White board, Albums, Friends, Personal and Work.

==== Web search engine ====
The web search engine consisted of the following components:

- Crawler(s) (Grub),
- Indices, the search engine proper (three selectable indices, by default an index that uses Nutch)
- and browser based results presentation (written in JavaScript)

The results presentation used XML-formatted requests to query the index. The XML format is called "Open Index and can be used to query indices other than the one at Internet Systems Consortium (ISC). The results presentation once included an option to select a different index to be used (out of three).

The project used an open-source algorithm and emphasized the importance of transparency.

In early 2009, Yahoo! BOSS was being used as the back-end.

=== Organization ===
The servers that implemented the web search engine's default index were owned and operated by the ISC. Although the index servers were donated to ISC, the index server's domain name still remains that of the Wikia Search software labs, The search engine's main page and result pages themselves were served by Wikia (note that the result pages' content was retrieved from the index server at swlabs.org, not from wikia.com).

The social network, like the results presentation, was hosted by Wikia.

Search Wikia, the wiki which hosted the mini articles, is hosted by Wikia. The wiki's content is licensed under the GNU Free Documentation License (GFDL). Although formally owned by Wikia, Wikia's management have stated that they want the wiki's user community to govern the wiki, as is custom with Wikia wikis in general.

== See also ==
- Knowledge Engine (Wikimedia Foundation) – 2015-2016 exploration of creating a search engine
