= Now I Know =

Now I Know may refer to:

- Now I Know (Jack Jones song), 1967
- Now I Know (Lari White song), 1994
- Now I Know (novel), a young adult novel by Aidan Chambers
- Now I Know (newsletter), a daily email newsletter about trivia
- Now I Know, a song by Rihanna, from the album Music of the Sun
- Now I Know..., a song by Lydia, from the album Devil
