= Grub (search engine) =

Open source distributed search crawler platform

Grub was an open source distributed search crawler platform.

Users of Grub could download the peer-to-peer client software and let it run during their computer's idle time. The client fetched a list of URLs from the main grub server, indexed them and sent them back to the main grub server in a compressed form.

== History ==
Grub, Inc. was founded in 2000 by Kord Campbell in Oklahoma City. Intellectual property rights were acquired from Grub in January 2003 for $1.3 million in cash and stock by LookSmart. For a short time the original team continued working on the project, releasing several new versions of the software, albeit under a closed license.

Operations of Grub were shut down in late 2005. On July 27, 2007, Jimmy Wales announced that Wikia, then developing an open-source search engine called Wikia Search, had acquired Grub from LookSmart. Wikia, now called Fandom, released the Grub source under an open-source license.
