= Presearch =

Presearch may refer to:

- Presearch (search engine), a distributed search engine
- Presearch, a UK laboratory services company acquired by UDG Healthcare
