= LyricWiki =

Former lyrics database

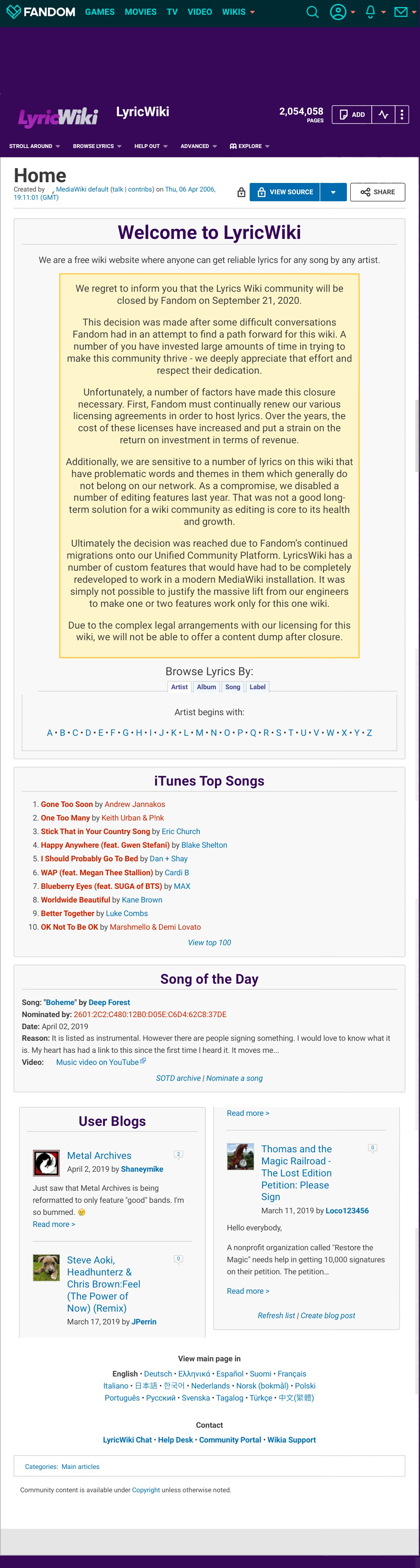
- Screenshot of the main page
- Website type: Internet lyrics database
- Available in: Multilingual (13 active Main Page translations)
- Dissolved: September 21, 2020; 6 years ago
- Owner: Fandom
- Creator: Sean Colombo
- Commercial: Yes
- Registration: Optional
- Launched: April 6, 2006; 20 years ago
- Current status: Offline

LyricWiki (also known as Lyrically or LyricWikia) was an online wiki-based lyrics database and encyclopedia. In March 2013, it was the seventh largest MediaWiki installation with over 2,000,000 pages including 1.5 million songs. Prior to its shutdown, users on the site could view, edit, and discuss the lyrics of songs, which were also available for purchase from links on the site. Users were told to be mindful of copyright while contributing, and copyright violations were removed upon request. All the lyrics on LyricWiki were licensed through LyricFind.

== History ==
On April 6, 2006, Sean Colombo, then a student at Rochester Institute of Technology, created LyricWiki. Soon after, the site won the DreamHost Site of the Month award for April 2006 which helped jump-start its growth since winners of the contest are announced in DreamHost's monthly newsletter, which claimed to have over 50,000 subscribers at the time.

Motive Force LLC, the parent company of LyricWiki, was the target of a lawsuit brought forth against it by the National Music Publishers Association. As a result, the site migrated to Wikia, which had a blanket licensing arrangement with Gracenote to provide lyrics, and blocked access to certain songs' full lyrics via API.

== Application programming interface and apps ==
The site allowed programmatic access to the contents of its database through a web API. Following a 2009 agreement with licensors, queried lyrics may be displayed partially with a link to their respective web page. This API has been leveraged to create plugins for many media players including Winamp, Amarok, Windows Media Player, iTunes, musikCube, foobar2000, iTunes via Mac OS X Dashboard, and more. LyricWiki has also released a Facebook application called "LyricWiki Challenge" which is a social, competitive game based on identifying lyrics from popular songs in several genres. Though, since early 2016, API has been discontinued due to licensing restrictions.

Wikia also developed a mobile app called Lyrically that utilized the lyric database of LyricWiki and displayed lyrics based on the song being played.

== Edit lock and closure ==
On April 2, 2019, LyricWiki was closed to editing by Fandom (formerly Wikia) for repeated violations of the site's terms of service. The reasoning for this was that Fandom did not approve of images and lyrics that are "overly sexual" and/or shocking, as Fandom was aiming to be a "family-friendly site". The site was shut down completely on September 21, 2020. Prior to the shutdown, a notice on the wiki stated that a data dump would not be offered; however, dumps were available on the "Closed Wiki" landing page for a period of time.
