= Gene Kan =

American computer programmer (1977–2002)

Gene Kan (September 6, 1976 — June 29, 2002) was a British-born Chinese American peer-to-peer file-sharing programmer who was among the first programmers to produce an open-source version of the file-sharing application that implemented the Gnutella protocol. Kan worked together with Spencer Kimball on the program called "gnubile" licensed under the GNU General Public License. Kan graduated from the University of California, Berkeley in 1997 with a major in electrical engineering and computer science, and was a member of the student club the eXperimental Computing Facility (XCF).

In June 2000, when Kan was 24, he formed a distributed search engine known as InfraSearch.com with Steve Waterhouse and another friend. Netscape co-founder Marc Andreessen was an investor in the start-up. InfraSearch was purchased by Sun Microsystems on March 6, 2001 for $12.5M USD in Sun stock options. The acquisition became part of the JXTA project at Sun. Kan joined Sun as an employee, and continued to work with the technology.

Kan was relatively well known in internet circles for a testimony he gave in July 2000 at the Senate Judiciary Committee Hearing on "Intellectual Property in the Digital Age". Metallica drummer Lars Ulrich, Sony CEO Fred Ehrlich, and others also gave testimony at the hearing. In his account, as the United States Senate decides the fate of companies like Napster, he stressed that "technology moves forward and leaves the stragglers behind," and that "the adopters always win, and the stalwarts always lose". Kan was advocate of peer-to-peer (P2P) computing and some credit him, along with other Gnutella pioneers, as its originator. He argued that it is part of an emergent technological area called distributive computing.

On June 29, 2002, he committed suicide. The cause of death was a single gunshot wound to the head. Kan was 25 years old. Prior to taking his life, Kan updated an electronic copy of his resume hosted on a University of California, Berkeley server to read "Summary: Sad example of a human being. Specializing in failure." An independent documentary film was planned for Gene Kan after he died, but it never started production.
