= Uncyclopedia =

Satirical website

- Screenshot The main page of Uncyclopedia (retrieved May 24, 2019) is similar to Wikipedia's.
- Website type: Online encyclopedia, satire
- Owners: Works are owned by their authors CC BY-NC-SA 2.0 (English-language version)
- Creators: Jonathan "Chronarion" Huang, "Stillwaters"
- Revenue: Donations
- Website: Disputed
- Registration: Optional
- Launched: January 5, 2005; 21 years ago
- Current status: Active

Uncyclopedia is a wiki that parodies Wikipedia and other online encyclopedias. Its logo, a hollow "puzzle potato", parodies Wikipedia's puzzle globe logo, and it styles itself as "the content-free encyclopedia", parodying Wikipedia's slogan of "the free encyclopedia" and likely as a play on the fact that Wikipedia is described as a "free-content" encyclopedia. Uncyclopedia's name is a portmanteau of the prefix un- and the word encyclopedia.

Founded in 2005 as an English-language wiki, the website was acquired by Wikia in 2006 but abandoned in 2019. Today the project exists as two distinct forks with different domains, whereas the original domain is now defunct. Uncyclopedia is associated with the "Uncyclomedia Foundation" (a pun on the Wikimedia Foundation), a project which spans several wikis like Uncyclopedia in more than 75 languages, as well as a wiki for hosting images called UnCommons (a reference to Wikimedia Commons) and an off-shoot wiki by the name of "Illogicopedia".

Various styles of humor are used as vehicles for parody, from pointed satire to light sarcasm, along with structured in-jokes and frequent non sequiturs. The site has attracted media attention for its articles on controversial subjects including religion, prominent people, places, politics, and pseudoscience.

Many Uncyclopedia articles contain graphics with a link to the corresponding Wikipedia article; Uncyclopedia often denotes the corresponding Wikipedia article to its content as being listed "for those without comedic tastes", and Wikipedia's article written by "so-called experts".

== History ==
Uncyclopedia's "About" page highlights its comical nature, disparagingly linking to its Wikipedia article.

Uncyclopedia was launched on January 5, 2005, by Jonathan Huang, known online as "Chronarion", and a partner known online as "Stillwaters". It was situated at uncyclopedia.org until July 2006, when it was acquired by Wikia.

In January 2013 some Uncyclopedia editors and administrators set up a fork of Uncyclopedia at uncyclopedia.co, in response to Wikia's censorship, insertion of advertising, and the imposition of content warnings. Colloquially, the site that remained on Wikia became known as "the spoon", a play on the other site being "the fork".

In 2016 Wikia rebranded as Fandom, and in February 2019 announced it would cease hosting its version of Uncyclopedia based on “problematic” content. On May 14, 2019, the "spoon" moved to uncyclopedia.ca and, in September 2021, to uncyclopedia.com.

As of December 30, 2025, the English-language version of "the spoon" had 37,376 content pages, while "the fork" had 41,142 content pages, second only to the Portuguese version, which has 70,111 articles.

== Structure ==
Uncyclopedia is built on the same MediaWiki software that Wikipedia uses. However, during Fandom's (Wikia's) hosting of Uncyclopedia, Fandom extensively modified its version of MediaWiki version 1.19, making the Fandom Uncyclopedia site incompatible with later MediaWiki versions. In May 2018 Fandom dropped support for the Monobook skin that its Uncyclopedia site had used to mimic Wikipedia, claiming this was necessary to achieve GDPR compliance, and warned that local work-arounds could not be extended to new visitors and editors by default. Since all Uncyclopedias split off or were removed from Fandom, they mostly switched to using Vector instead (with MinervaNeue on mobile), in order to continue parodying Wikipedia.

Uncyclopedia projects are run independently by their own members, though some users have accounts on multiple Uncyclopedias. They contain interlanguage links to each other, but there is no global governing organization comparable to the Wikimedia Foundation that oversees Wikipedia as well as its sister projects.

== Content ==
Uncyclopedia's content is licensed under the Creative Commons Attribution-NonCommercial-ShareAlike 2.0 (CC BY-NC-SA 2.0) license. Different Uncyclopedias sometimes have different licenses; for example, dÉsencyclopédie (French Uncyclopedia) is dual-licensed under CC BY-NC-SA 2.0 and the GFDL.

Many articles on Uncyclopedia link to corresponding Wikipedia article on the subject, and they often designate Wikipedia's content as being written by "so-called experts"; this is most often denoted by Uncyclopedia articles with a corresponding Wikipedia article having a graphic located to the side of an article linking the related Wikipedia article to be used for "those without comedic tastes".

=== Articles ===
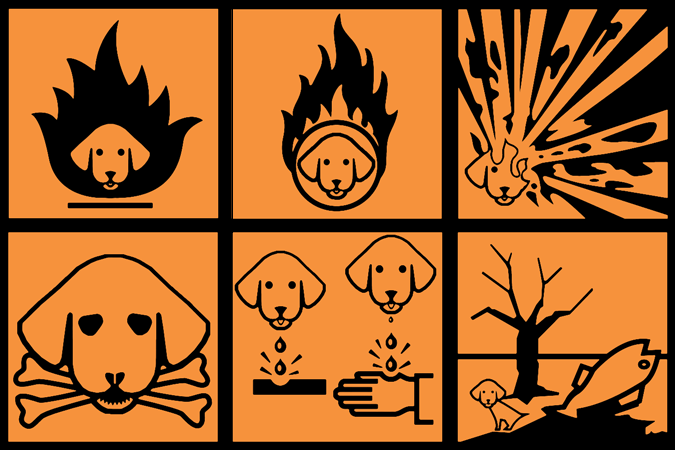
Where available, Uncyclopedia makes use of visual aids as a complement to its text, such as these European hazard symbols that include dogs.

Uncyclopedia encourages satire that is close to or resembles the truth. However, many articles employ absurdist humor and little, if any, factual accuracy remains. For example, Uncyclopedia's article about Wikipedia claims that Wikipedia is a parody of Uncyclopedia, not the reverse. Many articles on the site contradict each other, even articles on the same subject.

Like Wikipedia's "Five pillars", Uncyclopedia has "Five pliers", including "Satirical point of view". Its code of conduct follows from three main rules: "Be funny and not just stupid", "Don't be a dick", and "Dance like you've never danced before!"

Parodying Wikipedia's article review service peer review, Uncyclopedia has a "Pee Review" where authors seek review by other Uncyclopedians on humor, grammar, spelling, use of images, and overall presentation. Users can post to other wiki pages to solicit coding help and review or request user-edited images. Like Wikipedia, Uncyclopedia features articles and images on its front page. A system of user voting decides which articles and images to feature, usually deciding based on humor and writing quality. The site also welcomes audio contributions such as narration of articles. Uncyclopedia's articles often begin with quotations, usually misquoted, fictitiously attributed or entirely fabricated. Among the most recurrent themes is the invention of quotes attributed to Oscar Wilde, prompted by an article stating that inventing Wilde quotes was the "national sport of England", and themes such as "kitten huffing" (the inhalation of the souls of cats as a form of drug abuse).

Much like Wikipedia, Uncyclopedia has policies concerning vanity articles, which are articles written by an individual associated with the subject of the page. Vanity articles were disallowed after many of them produced flame wars. Uncyclopedia does not police conflict of interest but may delete submissions as non-notable on a case-by-case basis, using an AfD-like system called "Votes for deletion" (VfD) and a CSD-like system called "QuickVFD".

One of Uncyclopedia's most popular articles, "AAAAAAAAA!" is a nonsensical page, with its content completely consisting of the upper-case letter A with images and some punctuation marks.

=== Site-wide pranks ===
Uncyclopedia's logo for Wikipedia

Some jokes involve the entire website, sometimes including a re-skin of the main page, such as with holiday themes. In 2012, as a parody of Wikipedia's black-out protest against the Stop Online Piracy Act (SOPA) et al., Uncyclopedia blocked all content for a day with a notice claiming to support the bills. A tradition of April Fool's Day front page pranks occurs on the wiki, including a "blood donation" plea banner to spoof wiki donation banners on April 1, 2014. For one week in 2013, the Wikia fork interrupted viewing with a claim that the site was unavailable, spoofing a notice on the NASA website during the United States federal government shutdown of 2013.

=== Traditions ===
Each year, Uncyclopedia writers create a list of 100 worst reflections of that year, marking website milestones or simply news. Most years, the creators of the list reveal that they have once again put off the list until the last second, and simply skip a large chunk to get to a hundred in time. Other Uncyclopedia traditions include creating a "top 10" list of articles for each year, chosen by popular vote.

=== Subprojects ===
Uncyclomedia project	Object of parody
UnBooks	Wikibooks
UnNews	Wikinews
Undictionary	Wiktionary
Un-Bestiary	Wikispecies
Uncycloversity	Wikiversity
UnQuotable	Wikiquote
UnScripts	Wikisource
UnMeta-Wiki	Wikimedia Meta-Wiki
UnCommons (Uncyclomedia Commons)	Wikimedia Commons
UnSignpost	Wikipedia Signpost
UnTunes	iTunes
UnVoyage	Wikivoyage
HowTo	wikiHow
Why?	Answers.com
Un-Games	Choose your own adventure books
UnDebate	Debatepedia
UnPoetia	Poetry (in general)
Undata	Wikidata
UnReviews	Reviews (in general)

As well as housing many articles designed to satirize Wikipedia-style content, Uncyclopedia contains several secondary projects (known as "UnProjects"). As of 2017 there were sixteen such subprojects, each of which specializes in parody of a different information style. Many of these are directly analogous to Wikipedia's sister projects, while others such as UnTunes and HowTo parody projects completely unrelated to Wikipedia.

== Press coverage ==
Uncyclopedia has been referenced in several well-known news publications from around the world, in addition to numerous local and regional newspapers and periodicals. In 2005 the Flying Spaghetti Monster entry from Uncyclopedia was mentioned in a New York Times column reporting the spread of "Pastafarianism", the religion that worships the Flying Spaghetti Monster. The column was then reprinted in other newspapers, including the Taipei Times. The magazine .net featured an interview with Huang about Uncyclopedia in May 2007. A number of other articles have been centred on specific entries on Uncyclopedia – most notably the article in the Arizona Daily Star, which focused on the Tucson, Arizona parody, and the article in the Cyprus Mail, which focused on the Cyprus article.

In addition to articles about specific entries on the wiki, several papers speak of the website in general – usually in a section devoted to technology or the Internet. This was the case when Uncyclopedia was referenced in the Boston Herald and The Guardian. Although most articles mentioning Uncyclopedia are specific to the site, there are other articles about Wikia or Wikipedia that just mention its name briefly. These include the editorial in The Register discussing the Seigenthaler incident, in which Uncyclopedia was named only once. It has also been listed as one of the "Top 100 Undiscovered Web Sites" in PC Magazine, as well as among the "101 most useful websites" on the internet by The Sunday Telegraph. Seattle Post-Intelligencer considers Uncyclopedia to be the wiki site equivalent of The Onion.

== Criticism and controversy ==
The mobile version of an Uncyclopedia article about itself

At various times, articles on Uncyclopedia have been subject to criticism from King's College (School, Auckland) the North-West Evening Mail, Northern Irish politician James McCarry, civic leaders of Telford, Shropshire, UK, the Sioux City Journal, Hawke's Bay Today, and Lochaber News.

In January 2008 the Malaysian Internal Security Ministry issued a directive alerting newspaper editors not to trust Uncyclopedia. It said the article concerning Malaysia contained "untruths, insults and ridicule" and was demeaning to the country.

The site uses a layout that looks similar to Wikipedia's, which may confuse inexperienced users who misinterpret the content as factual.

In November 2012 the page "HowTo:Commit suicide" on Absurdopedia, the Russian-language Uncyclopedia, was legally prohibited by the Russian Federal Service for Supervision of Consumer Rights Protection and Human Welfare (Rospotrebnadzor). Absurdopedia administrator Edward Chernenko unsuccessfully sued them under his right to science and culture guaranteed by the Russian Constitution. During the proceedings, the Russian government and its experts claimed that Absurdopedia is intentionally trying to increase the number of child suicides in Russia by providing children with instructions for killing themselves. As of 2013, the case is currently in the ECHR.

In 2014 the page "HowTo:Make a bomb at home" on Absurdopedia was included in the Russian list of extremist materials.

In August 2014 the logo displayed for Greggs on its Google profile was mistakenly temporarily switched to the logo used on Uncyclopedia's article on the subject at the Wikia site due to a caching issue, causing a PR crisis for the company.

In 2017 two pages of Absurdopedia were banned in Russia: "HowTo:Bathe a cat" for "calls to violence against animals" and "HowTo:Make a nuclear bomb" for "information on manufacturing weapons".

== See also ==
- Bigipedia
- Encyclopedia Dramatica
