= WiseNut =

Crawler-based search engine

- Website type: Web search engine
- Website: www.wisenut.com at the Wayback Machine (archived September 27, 2007)
- Launched: September 5, 2001; 25 years ago
- Current status: Defunct

WiseNut was a crawler-based search engine that officially launched on September 5, 2001. Like Teoma, WiseNut automatically clustered search results, a technology called WiseGuide. Despite being referred to as a "Google killer" and having a good start, WiseNut never managed to become a major search engine. It lacked boolean search in the standard search and other advanced search features. The company was based in San Francisco, California.

On March 12, 2002, LookSmart announced that they would be acquiring WiseNut for about $9.25 million in stock. LookSmart completed the acquisition in April.

WiseNut shut down in late-September 2007.
