= LookSmart =

American company

- Founded: 1995 (as Homebase); October 1996 (as LookSmart)
- Headquarters: Henderson, Nevada, United States
- Founders: Evan Thornley; Tracy Ellery
- Website: looksmart.com

LookSmart is an American search advertising, content management, online media, and technology company. It provides search, machine learning and chatbot technologies as well as pay-per-click and contextual advertising services.

LookSmart also licenses and manages search ad networks as white-label products. It abides by the click measurement guidelines of the Interactive Advertising Bureau.

LookSmart also owns several subsidiaries, including Clickable Inc., LookSmart AdCenter, Novatech.io, ShopWiki and Syncapse.

The current CEO of LookSmart is Michael Onghai and the company is headquartered in Henderson, Nevada.

== Etymology ==
The name "LookSmart" is a double entendre, referring to both its selective, editorially compiled directory and as a compliment to users whom the company thinks "look smart".

== History ==
=== 1995–1998 ===
LookSmart was founded as Homebase in 1995 in Melbourne, Australia by husband and wife Evan Thornley and Tracy Ellery, executives of McKinsey & Company. Reader's Digest invested $5 million in the company for an 80% stake. The original concept of Homebase was to build a female and family-friendly web portal to supplement the Reader's Digest magazine. After leadership and strategy changes at Reader's Digest, which reduced RD's focus on its online business, RD wanted to shut down Homebase, which would have cost $4 million in payouts and other termination costs. The founders and former McKinsey's employee Martin Hosking instead proposed a cheaper leveraged buyout of Homebase.

On 28 October 1996, the company launched its LookSmart search engine. At launch, the search engine listed more than 85,000 sites and had a "Java-enhanced" interface. In June 1997, the search engine underwent a major redesign, dropping its original Java-based browsing system.

LookSmart was sold back to the founders as well as Martin Hosking through a leveraged buyout in 1998, with Reader's Digest providing a $1.5 million loan and retaining about a 10% equity stake. Also in 1998, a search box was added to the LookSmart search engine along with People Search, Yellow pages, Discussions and shopping search. In May 1998, the company raised $2.3 million from Amwin and $6.0 million from Cox Media Group and Macquarie Bank and was valued at $23.3 million. On 21 December 1998, LookSmart stopped accepting pornographic advertisements.

=== 1999–2001 ===
By 1999, the company had 500 employees and LookSmart was the twelfth most visited website worldwide with 10 million users, behind AltaVista and ahead of Snap. In early-1999, the company reached an agreement to provide directory and listing services for Microsoft for 5 years. The deal provided the company with $30 million upfront and guaranteed payments of $5 million per year. In late-March 1999, the company raised $59.6 million based on a post-money valuation of $430 million from Amerindo Investment Advisors, Citicorp Equity Capital, Cox Interactive Media, Hambrecht & Quist and others. In May 1999, LookSmart formed a strategic partnership with direct-response marketing company Guthy-Renker and acquired some of their assets from their e-commerce division for $3 million.

On 20 August 1999, during the dot-com bubble, the company became a public company via an initial public offering on the NASDAQ, debuting at $12 per share and raising $92.4 million based on a $1 billion valuation for the company. LookSmart used the money it made from its IPO to open offices in Denmark, Canada and the Netherlands. By October 1999, the stock price reached $30 per share, giving the company a market capitalization of $2.5 billion. The founders' 15% stake was worth $375 million. On 10 November 1999, LookSmart and BT Group founded joint venture BT LookSmart. In December 1999, LookSmart purchased FutureCorp and its free email service Start for more than $5 million from its co-founders Michael Mak and Bardia Housman. Also in December, LookSmart acquired 14.5% of the voting stock of Dstore Pty Ltd. for $300,000.

In 2000, FindArticles, a website which provided access to articles previously published in magazines, journals, and other sources, was founded as a partnership between LookSmart, which authored the search technology, and the Gale Group, which provided the articles for a fee.

In March 2000, LookSmart's stock price briefly peaked at $72 per share. On 28 March 2000, the International Olympic Committee (IOC) signed a sponsorship deal with LookSmart by adding a custom-built LookSmart directory to the Olympic Games' website. On 30 May 2000, Juno Online Services reached an agreement with LookSmart to provide Juno's subscribers access to LookSmart's directory and LookSmart's stock jumped 8%. On 26 July 2000, AltaVista reached an agreement with LookSmart for it to be their exclusive directory provider. In October 2000, the company acquired Zeal for $20 million.

As a result of the dot-com bubble bursting in late 2000, the company fired 172 employees or 31% of its staff in January 2001 to cut costs. Also in January, LookSmart shut down Inside The Web and LookSmart Live! due to them being unrelated to their core business model. On 17 January 2001, the company reached a deal to provide product categories from its directory to Amazon.

Also after the dot-com bubble burst, LookSmart paid $90,000 to transfer 52.8% of its ownership of FutureCorp back to its founders.

=== 2002–2003 ===
On 12 March 2002, LookSmart announced that they would be acquiring WiseNut for about $9.25 million in stock. LookSmart completed their acquisition of WiseNut in April. In June 2002, Thornley resigned as CEO but stayed on as chairman and three of the seven members of the board of directors resigned in response, including Robert Ryan, Myriann Byerwalter and James Tananbaum. In July 2002, BT LookSmart acquired UK Plus from Associated New Media (ANM) for an undisclosed amount. On 1 October 2002, Jason Kellerman became the CEO of LookSmart, having previously served as COO of the company. In early-December 2002, LookSmart paid US$3.5 million in cash and 1 million in LookSmart shares to purchase BT LookSmart from BT Group and subsequently shut down the joint venture. LookSmart also returned US$1.5 million in restricted cash that was to be used for the funding of the joint venture.

In January 2003, LookSmart acquired Intellectual property rights from Grub for $1.3 million in cash and stock. On 6 March 2003, LookSmart announced that they had renewed an agreement with Time Warner Cable's Road Runner division to continue providing directory listings for Road Runner subscribers. On 9 July 2003, LookSmart announced that they had reached an agreement to provide listing services in the United States for web portal Terra Lycos.

In August 2003, LookSmart stated in a financial report that Microsoft, which accounted for 64% of the company's listing revenues in the last 6 months and 70% of the company's overall revenue, started testing its own search technology without LookSmart's listings on some of its websites in the United Kingdom and LookSmart's stock dropped more than 20% on 15 August and continued dropping on 18 August. Also in August, William Lonergan became the new CFO of LookSmart. In October 2003, LookSmart reintroduced its bid-for-placement ads in order to compete with Google and Yahoo!, which were previously offered through LookSmart's UK division. On 6 October 2003, Microsoft announced that it would not renew its agreement with LookSmart and the company's stock price plunged 52.3% in a day and its stock fell to $1.44 per share. In response to this, LookSmart fired half of its employees in December 2003.

In September 2003, the company settled a lawsuit filed in May 2002 by Legal Staffing Partners after the company converted thousands of websites that originally had paid a onetime submission fee into a cost-per-click payment model.

In 2003, LookSmart had a net income of $5.8 million and made $140.9 million in revenue.

=== 2004–2009 ===
In January 2004, LookSmart sold its Australian operations to Telstra's online division Sensis and most of LookSmart's 30 employees in Australia started working for Sensis. Also in January, Jason Kellerman resigned as CEO of LookSmart and was temporarily replaced as CEO by Damian Smith. Starting on 15 January 2004, LookSmart's directory listings were no longer shown on MSN Search. In April 2004, LookSmart acquired Net Nanny from BioNet Systems, LLC for $5.3 million in stock and cash. On 1 July 2004, Teresa Dial replaced Thornley as chairman of the company.

In 2005, LookSmart was forced to consolidate its shares after facing suspension from the NASDAQ. On 15 March 2005, LookSmart had a market cap of $96.21 million and its stock price was at $0.85 per share. In May 2005, LookSmart started providing Ask.com with its sponsored listings. On 28 March 2006, LookSmart closed the Zeal directory.

In January 2007, ContentWatch Inc. acquired Net Nanny from LookSmart. John Simonelli, the CFO and COO of LookSmart, resigned in June 2007. On 17 July 2007, the company sold Grub to Wikia for $50,000. On 1 August 2007, David Hills resigned as CEO of LookSmart and Edward West was appointed CEO the same day. Also in August, LookSmart's management made the decision to exit consumer products and sell or dispose of their websites and assets associating with their consumer properties revenue stream. Further developments in 2007 included Michael Grubb resigning as CTO of LookSmart on 7 September 2007, LookSmart closing WiseNut in late-September, the company delisting from the Australian Securities Exchange on 1 October, the company selling Zeal on 15 October for $50,000, the company selling FindArticles to CNET Networks on 9 November for $20.5 million, and William Bush being appointed CFO of LookSmart on 20 December.

On 14 January 2009, LookSmart had a market cap of US$28 million and its stock price was at $0.14 per share. In March 2009, the company sold Furl to Diigo. In May 2009, Ask.com, which accounted for 89% of LookSmart's company publisher solutions revenue in the first quarter of 2009, announced that it would not renew its contract with LookSmart for sponsored listings. In December 2009, Jean-Yves Dexmier became the CEO of LookSmart. On 31 December 2009, Ask.com ended its contract with LookSmart for sponsored listings.

=== 2013–present ===
In February 2013, Michael Onghai became the CEO of LookSmart. On 2 September 2013, LookSmart's Canadian subsidiary, LookSmart Canada Ltd., acquired assets of Syncapse Corp. upon court approval for $3 million. On 22 September 2014, LookSmart announced the launch of its Information Technology services offering Novatech.io.

On 16 July 2015, the company had a market cap of around $3.6 million and its stock price was at $0.63 per share. In October 2015, the company transferred all of its assets to its subsidiary, LookSmart Group Inc. and spun off the ownership of LookSmart Group to its shareholders. LookSmart, Ltd., the company's former entity, completed a merger with Maritime Technologies Corp., a subsidiary of Pyxis Tankers Inc., on 28 October.

On 24 March 2017, LookSmart Group completed a merger with its subsidiary, LookSmart Capital Inc. and LookSmart Group announced that it would de-register its common stock and suspend its public reporting obligations. The company changed its trading symbol to LKSTD for 20 business days and changed its trading symbol back to LKST afterwards.

On 3 April 2017, LookSmart Group announced the launch of its new data center building located in Central Phoenix, Arizona as a technology center, Silicon Canyon. On 13 April 2017, LookSmart Group announced partnerships with the Clickable Institute of Technology, Entrepreneurship and Digital marketing and Richie Bello West to help veterans, minorities and immigrants at Silicon Canyon.
