= Fanatical (company) =

Online game store based in the UK

- Formerly: Bundle Stars, rebranded to Fanatical 1 November 2017
- Type: Subsidiary
- Industry: Video games, electronic commerce, Digital distribution
- Founded: 2012; 14 years ago
- Headquarters: Rugeley, Staffordshire, England
- Products: Digital game keys, Bundles, Software, Comics, E-books
- Parent: Focus Multimedia Limited Fandom, Inc. (since February 2021)
- Website: www.fanatical.com

Fanatical (formerly Bundle Stars) is an e-commerce and digital distribution platform based in the United Kingdom that sells video game keys and other digital products.

It is a subsidiary of Focus Multimedia Limited, which was acquired by Fandom, Inc. in February 2021. The company is based in Rugeley, Staffordshire, and focuses on the sale of officially authorised keys, acquired directly from publishers and developers.

== History ==
Fanatical's origins lie with its parent company, Focus Multimedia Limited, a British publisher of PC CD-ROM software and games established in 1995.

=== Focus Multimedia (1995–2012) ===
Focus Multimedia Limited was founded in October 1995 by Craig Johnson and Lawrence Reeves, based in Rugeley, England. The company was initially a publisher and distributor of PC CD-ROM software, with a diverse catalogue that included the flagship brand Driving Test Success, a popular CD-ROM revision tool for learner drivers in the UK. The company sold its products through major high street retailers globally.

=== Bundle Stars and Rebranding (2012–2017) ===
In 2012, in response to the industry's growing move to digitalisation, Focus Multimedia launched its first e-commerce platform, Bundle Stars. The store quickly grew by selling curated collections of games and offering them in significantly discounted bundles, primarily for the Steam platform.

On 1 November 2017, Bundle Stars officially rebranded as Fanatical. The change was made to reflect the platform's expanding focus beyond just bundles to include a large catalogue of single games, new releases, and titles. At the time of the rebrand, Bundle Stars had sold more than 45 million game keys to over one million customers.

=== Acquisition by Fandom (2021) ===
In February 2021, Focus Multimedia Limited (and therefore Fanatical) was acquired by the digital media company Fandom, Inc. for an undisclosed sum.

At the time, the company said it had sold more than 80 million game keys and e-books to customers in 200 countries. The acquisition was part of a strategy to connect its audience of 330m monthly users to digital game purchases.

Fanatical maintained its own brand identity and continues to operate from its UK base.

== Products and services ==
Fanatical operates a digital storefront that sells PC game activation codes, primarily for Steam, purchased and/or licensed directly from the developers and publishers. In late 2025, Fanatical reported that it had sold more than 145 million game keys to more than 4 million customers worldwide, and has broadened into ebook, graphic novel and software content.

=== Product Portfolio ===
The company’s product catalogue includes more than 16,000 officially licensed titles from over 1,800 publishers and developers. The store lists thousands of titles from publishers and developers including Bethesda Softworks, SEGA, Bandai Namco, Capcom and Konami.

- Game Bundles: This key product includes "Build Your Own Bundles", themed bundles and Charity Bundles, where all proceeds are typically donated fully to the partnered organisation. Fanatical often partners with organisations such as the NSPCC, War Child, the Movember movement, and the mental health charity Safe In Our World.
- Digital Keys: Offers individual purchases of new releases and back-catalogue titles.
- Non-Gaming Products: The platform sells software, e-learning courses, and e-books.
