= Now I Know (newsletter) =

Daily trivia newsletter

- Website type: Newsletter
- Owner: Dan Lewis
- Website: www.nowiknow.com
- Launched: 2010
- Current status: Active

Now I Know is a daily email newsletter about trivia written by Dan Lewis. Described as "a newer, less snarky iteration of Cecil Adams’ The Straight Dope," it has been running since 2010 with over 100,000 subscribers as of 2018.

The newsletter won a Webby Award for email newsletters in 2013 and 2014. Lewis credits his success to his engagement with his community, claiming he replies to nearly every email sent to him. He also notes his Jewish background saying "[T]here's an oral tradition in Judaism to explain and analyze things" which is the general theme of his newsletter which uses seemingly obscure facts to tell a bigger story.

== Writer ==
Lewis is a lawyer and co-founder of ArmchairGM, which was purchased by Wikia. He was an early blogger and is formerly the Senior Director of Digital Marketing at Sesame Workshop where he used to tweet for Big Bird and started most of Sesame Street's social media accounts. Lewis was also the Connecticut State Magic the Gathering Champion in 1997.

== Books ==
The newsletter has been turned into three books, Now I Know: The Revealing Stories Behind the World’s Most Interesting Facts, Now I Know More: The Revealing Stories Behind Even More of the World's Most Interesting Facts, and Now I Know: The Soviets Invaded Wisconsin?!: ...And 99 More Interesting Facts, Plus the Amazing Stories Behind Them. The newsletter is also being expanded to a YouTube series featuring Matt Silverman. Topics in the newsletter range from topical coverage such as the history of collect calling in the United States, to where the fear of poisoned Halloween candy comes from.
