= Gil Penchina =

American businessman

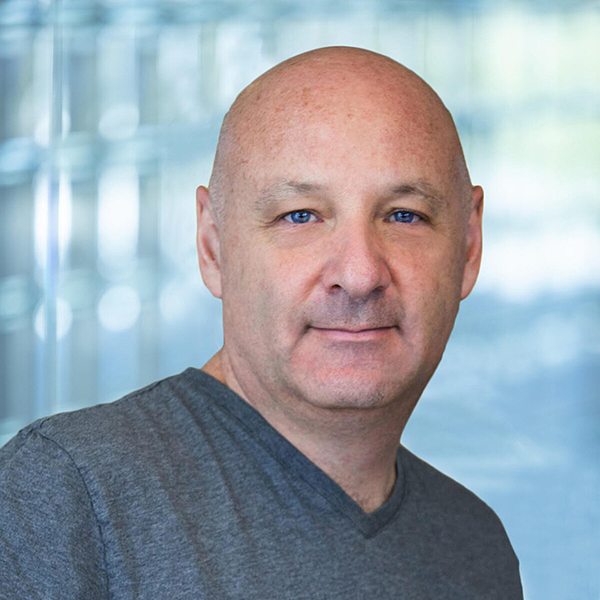
Gil Penchina in 2020

Gil Penchina is an American business manager. He was formerly the CEO of Wikia Inc., and the vice president and general manager, international at eBay.

He is a 1997 alumnus of the Kellogg School of Management at Northwestern University.

Gil Penchina is also well known for his business angel investments. He founded the angel investor syndicate Flight VC on AngelList and has invested in companies like PayPal, LinkedIn, Ripple, and many others.
