= Presearch (search engine) =

Decentralized privacy search engine

- Website type: Web search engine
- Website: presearch.com
- Registration: Optional
- Launched: 2017; 9 years ago

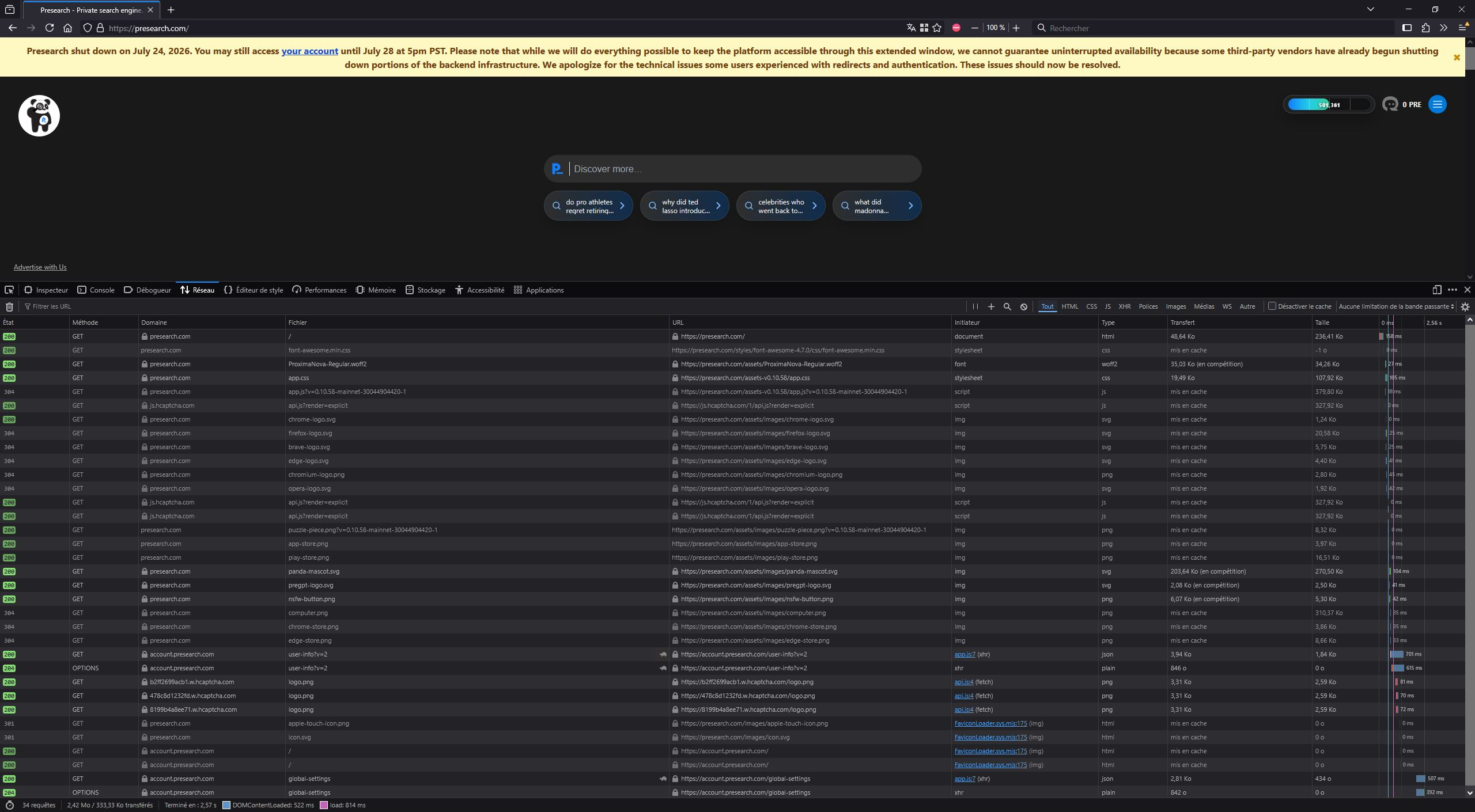

Presearch was a decentralized, privacy-focused metasearch engine. Presearch, which operated from 2017 to 2026, was developed by Presearch.org, originally a Canadian-based organization. The platform enabled users to query Web's search engines through a distributed computing network operated by independent node operators, which kept user data and searches private.

== Features ==
Presearch offered a customizable interface that allowed users to access multiple search providers, including Google, Bing, and DuckDuckGo, offering a private search option, even through other search engines. The platform included a keyword staking system where users could allocate PRE tokens to promote websites in search results. In late 2024, the project introduced a search ad format called "Takeover Advertising," and in early 2025 it launched "Spicy Mode," an optional feature for filtering adult content.

== Privacy and architecture ==
Presearch’s architecture used a decentralized network of community-operated nodes to process search queries. According to project documentation, the platform was designed to reduce centralized data collection and did not store users’ IP addresses or search histories. It also implemented techniques to limit browser fingerprinting.

== Independent search index and Frontier Intelligence ==
Frontier Intelligence was a feature of Presearch designed to provide users with access to a broader range of content that may be overlooked or suppressed by traditional search engines. The initiative focused on indexing human-first content, prioritizing relevance over commercial interests. Unlike commercial search engines that were influenced by advertising and corporate agendas, Frontier Intelligence aimed to offer a more diverse and decentralized search experience.

Central to this initiative was Presearch’s independent search index, which operated through a decentralized network of community-run nodes. This infrastructure allowed for the indexing of niche, controversial, or non-commercial content that was often excluded from mainstream search results. The independent search index was built to surface this underrepresented content, ensuring users had access to a wider variety of perspectives.

Presearch's results system operated without tracking or profiling users, providing search results based purely on content relevance.

== NSFW Spicy Mode ==
Launched in 2025, Spicy Mode was a privacy-focused feature on Presearch that allowed users to discover adult content creators in a private environment. The mode used the Presearch privacy architecture to keep searches and data private, while allowing users to search directly for adult content creators. Users could search for creators based on specific interests, including filtering by subscription price, region, likes, and free trial status.

In addition to providing a safe and private browsing experience, Spicy Mode also offered an avenue for adult creators, services, and products to advertise within ethical guidelines. The feature included non-intrusive wallpaper-style takeover ads, allowing adult brands to connect with their audience without the stigma or restrictions commonly found on mainstream platforms.

== Token system ==
The platform used PRE, an ERC-20 token on the Ethereum and Base blockchains. Registered users could earn tokens by running nodes or performing searches. Tokens could also be used to stake on keywords in the platform’s ad system.

== Node network ==
The Presearch network included tens of thousands of independently operated nodes that route search traffic. As of 2025, the software stack was partially open-source. A 2021 academic review of decentralized search engines noted that Presearch’s use of community nodes offered potential for scalability and privacy, but could have faced limitations compared to centralized systems in indexing and query speed.

== Governance and development ==
The project was maintained by a core development team with input from its broader community. The developers outlined plans to decentralize governance and increase transparency through open-sourcing more of the platform. In 2025, Presearch launched a WeFunder campaign to raise $1.2 million to accelerate the rollout of a decentralized web index and enhance various platform features.

== Reception ==
In 2021, Google added Presearch as a default search engine option on Android devices in the European Union, following antitrust rulings regarding search engine choice. The service was featured in industry publications and included in PCMag’s list of alternative search engines focused on privacy. A 2023 privacy-focused review by NicFab described Presearch as innovative and open, but noted that it may have required a learning curve for less technical users.

== Bankruptcy & Closure ==
On Friday, July 24, 2026 at 12:59 p.m. P.D.T., moderators on the official Presearch Sub-Reddit announced that "effective immediately" Presearch was shutting down. Web services were taken offline for a couple of hours until they were brought back online for a few more days so that users could have a small window to withdraw their Presearch tokens. The Reddit post linked to an article on Medium titled "A Message from the Presearch Team" where they explained in more detail why Presearch was shutting down. The platform had been struggling to gain more users over the past couple of years, and the development team had made serious efforts to keep the platform going by simplifying infrastructure, reducing costs, rebuilding critical systems, and improving the overall search experience. The decision to ultimately shutdown Presearch was made when it became apparent that the company had failed to attain the milestone of one million legitimate daily searches which would have moved the service into sustainable territory.
