= Fandom (website) =

American entertainment media conglomerate

- Logo used since August 3, 2021
- Former names: Wikicities (2004–2007); Wikia (2006–2016) (Note: Formally phased out gradually between 2018 and 2021.); FANDOM (2017–2021) (Note: Officially written in all-uppercase until 2019)
- Company type: Private
- Website type: Wiki hosting service; Internet forum; news
- Available in: Multilingual
- Founded: October 18, 2004; 22 years ago
- Headquarters: San Francisco, California, U.S.
- Owner: TPG Inc. (2018–present)
- Founders: Jimmy Wales; Angela Beesley Starling
- Key people: Jay Sullivan (CEO); Jimmy Wales (president)
- Products: Wiki hosting; news; marketing research; online advertising
- Subsidiaries: Comic Vine; Focus Multimedia; GameFAQs; GameSpot; Metacritic; Screen Junkies; TV Guide
- Website: fandom.com
- Advertising: Direct and advertising networks
- Registration: Optional
- Users: 350 million (as of December 11, 2023)
- Launched: October 18, 2004; 22 years ago (wiki hosting service; as Wikicities); January 25, 2016; 10 years ago (Fandom News and Stories)
- Current status: Active
- Content license: CC Attribution/ Share-Alike 3.0 Unported (Note: Media licensing varies.)
- Written in: PHP; JavaScript

Fandom (formerly known as Wikicities and Wikia) is an American media conglomerate backed by TPG, a private equity firm. The website offers a platform for hosting wiki pages with social media features on various topics such as video games, movies, books, and TV series. The company also owns several entertainment outlets such as GameSpot and TV Guide, multimedia databases such as GameFAQs, Metacritic and ComicVine, as well as online retailers such as Fanatical.

The privately held for-profit Delaware company was founded in October 2004 by Wikipedia co-founder Jimmy Wales and Angela Beesley Starling. Fandom was acquired in 2018 by TPG Inc. and Jon Miller through Integrated Media Co.

Fandom uses MediaWiki, the same open-source wiki software used by Wikipedia. (Note: Fandom's current MediaWiki version.) Unlike the Wikimedia Foundation, the nonprofit organization that hosts Wikipedia, Fandom, Inc. operates as a for-profit company and derives its income from advertising and sold content, publishing most user-provided text under copyleft licenses. The company also runs the associated Fandom editorial project, offering pop-culture and gaming news. Fandom wikis are hosted under the domain fandom.com, which has become one of the top 50 most visited websites in the world, rapidly rising in popularity beginning in the early 2020s. It ranks as the 50th as of October 2023, with 25.79% of its traffic coming from the United States, followed by Russia with 7.76%, according to Similarweb.

== History ==
=== 2004–2009: Early days and growth ===
Fandom was launched on October 18, 2004, at 23:50:49 (UTC) under the name Wikicities (which invited comparisons to Yahoo's GeoCities), by Jimmy Wales, co-founder of Wikipedia, and Angela Beesley Starling—respectively chairman emeritus and advisory board member of the Wikimedia Foundation. Wales' original idea was to use his Wikipedia idea for a place where people from the same city or other geographical place could come together.

The project's name was changed to Wikia on March 27, 2006. In the month before the move, Wikia announced a US$4 million venture capital investment from Bessemer Venture Partners and First Round Capital. Nine months later, Amazon.com invested $10 million in Series B funding. By September 2006, Wikia had approximately 1,500 wikis in 48 languages. Over time, Wikia has incorporated formerly independent fan wikis such as LyricWiki, Nukapedia, Uncyclopedia, and WoWWiki. Gil Penchina described Wikia early on as "the rest of the library and magazine rack" to Wikipedia's encyclopedia. The material has also been described as informal, and often bordering on entertainment, allowing the importing of maps, YouTube videos, and other non-traditional wiki material.

=== 2010–2015: New management ===
By 2010, wikis could be created in 188 different languages. In October 2011, Craig Palmer, the former CEO of Gracenote, replaced Penchina as CEO. In February 2012, co-founder Beesley Starling left Wikia to launch a startup called ChalkDrop.com. At the end of November 2012, Wikia raised $10.8 million in Series C funding from Institutional Venture Partners and previous investors Bessemer Ventures Partners and Amazon.com. Another $15 million was raised in August 2014 for Series D funding, with investors Digital Garage, Amazon, Bessemer Venture Partners, and Institutional Venture Partners. The total raised at this point was $39.8 million.

On March 4, 2015, Wikia appointed Walker Jacobs, former executive vice-president of Turner Broadcasting System, to the new position of chief operating officer. In December 2015, Wikia launched the Fan Contributor Program.

=== 2016–2017: Fandom brand ===
Former Fandom logo until May 2017

FANDOM logo from 2017 to 2021

On January 25, 2016, Wikia launched a new entertainment news site named Fandom. On October 4, Wikia itself was rebranded as "Fandom powered by Wikia", to better associate itself with the Fandom website. The parent company Wikia, Inc. remained under its then-current name until 2019, and the homepage of Wikia was moved to wikia.com/fandom and later to fandom.com. In December, Wikia appointed Dorth Raphaely, former general manager of Bleacher Report, as chief content officer.

On May 18, 2017, Fandom updated their branding with a refreshed logo, all-uppercase lettering, and a flat design replacing the previous green-blue gradients.

=== 2018–2022: Further acquisitions and changes ===
In February 2018, former AOL CEO Jon Miller, backed by private equity firm TPG Capital, acquired Fandom. Miller was named co-chairman of Wikia, Inc., alongside Jimmy Wales, and TPG Capital director Andrew Doyle assumed the role of interim CEO. In July, Fandom purchased Screen Junkies from Defy Media, and in December of that year, they had acquired Curse Media which included wiki farm Gamepedia and websites part of the Curse Network such as D&D Beyond, Futhead, Muthead, and StrawPoll.me.

In February 2019, former StubHub CEO Perkins Miller took over as CEO, and Wikia fully changed its domain name to fandom.com. Various wikis had been tested with the new domain during 2018, with some wikis that focused on "more serious topics" having their domains changed to wikia.org instead. In June, Fandom began an effort to rewrite its core platform, which was written based on MediaWiki version 1.19, to base it on a newer version of the software. On March 11, 2020, Fandom released the Unified Community Platform (UCP), based on MediaWiki 1.33, for newly created wikis.

In 2020, Fandom sold Curse Network properties to Magic Find which includes communities and news websites. In November, Fandom began to migrate Gamepedia wikis to a fandom.com domain as part of their search engine optimization strategy, with migrations continuing into 2021.

In February 2021, Fandom acquired Focus Multimedia, the retailer behind Fanatical, an e-commerce platform that sells digital games, ebooks and other products related to gaming. In late March, Fandom updated its terms of use policy to prohibit deadnaming transgender individuals across their websites. This policy was in response to a referendum on the Star Wars wiki Wookieepedia to ban deadnaming, which triggered a debate around an article about the non-binary artist Robin Pronovost. In response to the deadnaming controversy, Fandom also introduced new LGBT guidelines across its websites in late June 2021 which include links to queer-inclusive and trans support resources.

In June 2021, Fandom began to roll out FandomDesktop, a redesigned theme for desktop devices, with plans to retire its legacy Oasis and Hydra skins once the rollout was complete. Two months later on August 3, Fandom rolled out a new look, new colors, new logo, and introduced a new tagline, "For the love of fans." In late November/early December, all remaining wikis under the wikia.org domain migrated to the fandom.com domain.

On April 13, 2022, Hasbro announced that it would acquire D&D Beyond from Fandom. Fandom shut down StrawPoll.me in August. On October 3, Fandom acquired GameSpot, Metacritic, TV Guide, GameFAQs, Giant Bomb, Cord Cutters News, and Comic Vine from Red Ventures.

=== 2023–present: Mass layoffs and AI Integration ===
In early 2023, Fandom began laying off some of the team responsible for GameSpot, Metacritic and Giant Bomb. In January 2024, the company would begin another round of layoffs for part of GameSpot's editorial team. The layoffs included the dismissal of writers, graphic designers, and video producers who had worked in the industry for more than a decade.

Later in October 2024, it was reported that Fandom had laid off approximately 11% of their staff, including some of the team behind GameSpot UK and Honest Trailers as well as Fandom staff in charge of sales and management, this was prompted by the company's failure to hit revenue goals in 2024. In the same year, Fandom had previously announced that it was incorporating much more generative AI into the moderation of the website with the aim of optimizing certain tasks on the platform, including Image Review, with the goal of reducing the time and cost spent on moderation by using AI instead of humans.

In February 2025, Fandom launched a new product called "FanDNA Helix", an AI model trained on all the pages hosted on the site as well as users' social media posts in order to allow advertisers to serve ads to readers based on their interests and consumption habits on the site. In May 2025, Fandom later sold Giant Bomb to the site's staff after multiple conflicts regarding content regulations.

In July 2025, Fandom announced that it was going to translate entire wikis using generative AI for non-English speakers. In October 2025, Perkins Miller resigned as CEO of Fandom. An article published by The Verge stated that the company was struggling to meet revenue targets, leading to a massive restructuring and the layoff of a large percentage of Fandom's staff. The newspaper also clarified that although the IP-focused wikis hosted by the platform are popular, the ads and interface are quite invasive and cause the page to become unstable and "nearly unusable" when loading on certain devices. Technology reporter Ethan Gach described Perkins Miller's management of Fandom for Kotaku's Morning Checkpoint as one of the "worst CEOs in gaming media" following massive budget cuts for outlets such as GameSpot and that the platform had suffered greatly from "enshittification" policies in recent years with the aim of maximizing profits.

Starting in November 2025, in an effort to encourage wiki editing, Fandom adjusted its advertising approach so that logged-in users who are not actively editing may see advertisements, while active editors continue to receive a "little-to-no advertisement" experience.

On February 4, 2026, Jay Sullivan was named the new CEO. In a public statement following the arrival of Fandom's new CEO, the company's president, Jimmy Wales, mentioned that they intend to incorporate additional AI tools into Fandom Wikis to adapt to internet searches. In July 2026, Fandom would launch its fifth round of layoffs following the acquisition of GameSpot; these layoffs affected entire teams, as well as employees who were already on paid medical leave.

== Services and features ==
=== Present ===
==== Wikis ====
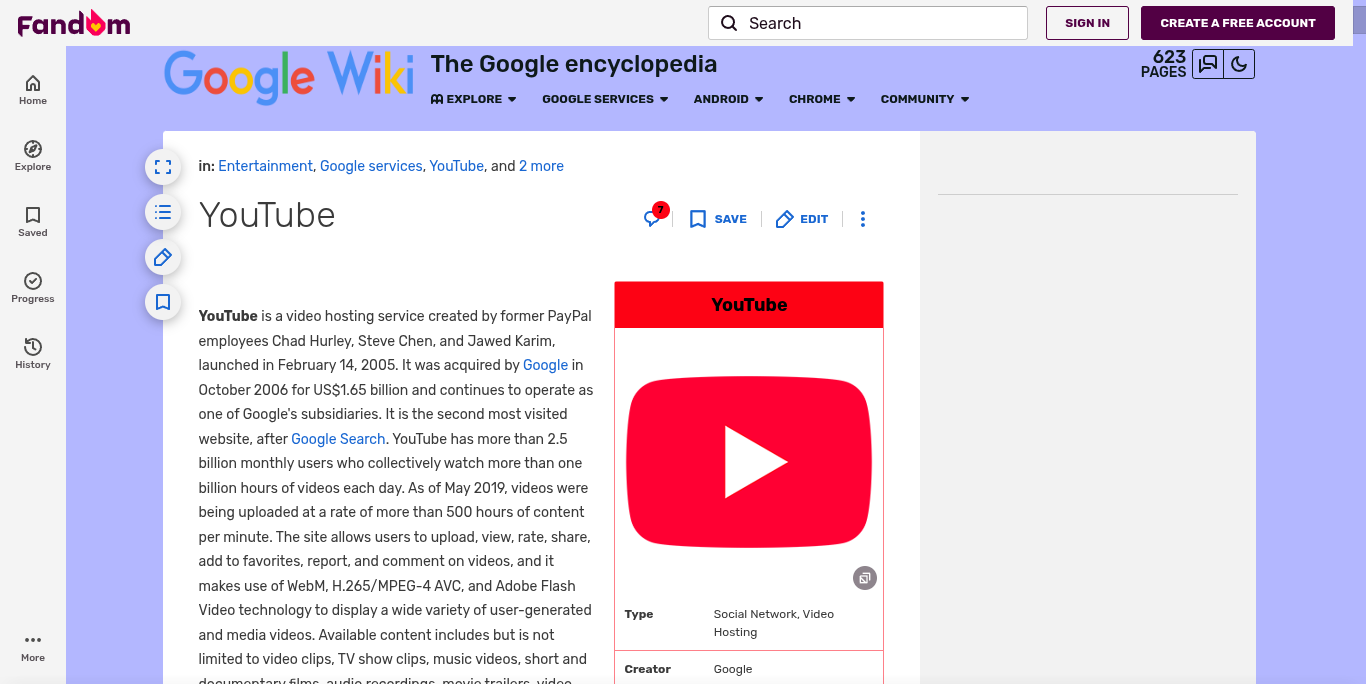
Screenshot of the YouTube article in Google Wiki, a community within Fandom

The main purpose of articles in a Fandom community is to cover information and discussion on a particular topic in a much greater and more comprehensive detail level than what can be found in Wikipedia articles.

Other examples of content that is generally considered beyond the scope of Wikipedia articles include Fandom information about video games and related video game topics, detailed instructions, gameplay details, plot details, and so forth. Gameplay concepts can also have their own articles. Fandom also allows wikis to have a point of view, rather than the neutral POV that is required by Wikipedia (although NPOV is a local policy on many Fandom communities).

The image policies of Fandom communities tend to be more lenient than those of Wikimedia Foundation projects, allowing articles with much more illustration. Fandom requires all user text content to be published under a free license; most use the Creative Commons Attribution-ShareAlike license, although a few wikis use a license with a noncommercial clause (for instance Memory Alpha, Uncyclopedia and others) and some use the GNU Free Documentation License. (Note: Most content on Wikia was licensed under the GNU Free Documentation License until June 19, 2009, at which point most wikis were relicensed to CC BY-SA.) Fandom's terms of use forbid hate speech, libel, pornography, or copyright infringement. Other material is allowed, as long as the added material does not duplicate existing wikis.

Wikis are also not owned by their founders, nor does the founder's opinion carry more weight in disagreements than any other user's opinion. Consensus and cooperation are the primary means for organizing a community on Fandom. However, Fandom may make decisions affecting the community even if there is no consensus at all.

==== Technology ====
As of May 2023, Fandom uses a heavily modified version of the MediaWiki software, based on the version 1.39 of MediaWiki. It has several custom extensions installed to add social features like blogs, chat, badges, forums, and multimedia, but also remove features like advanced user options or skins. The personal choice of using the Monobook skin instead of the default custom skin was removed on May 25, 2018, alluding to GDPR compliance.

In August 2016, Fandom announced it would switch to a service-oriented architecture. It removed many custom extensions and functionality for specific wikis, and has created certain replacement features to fill those needs.

==== Entertainment news ====
In 2016, Wikia launched Fandom, an online entertainment media website. The program utilizes volunteer contributors called "Fandom Contributors" to produce articles, working alongside an editorial team employed by Wikia. In contrast to the blogging feature of individual wiki communities, Fandom focuses on pop culture and fan topics such as video games, movies, and television shows. The project features fan opinions, interviews with property creators, reviews, and how-to guides. Fandom also includes videos and specific news coverage sponsored or paid for by a property creator to promote their property.

In the same year, it was also announced that the entire Wikia platform would be rebranded under the Fandom name on October 4, 2016. A leak from Fandom's Community Council was posted to Reddit's /r/Wikia subreddit in August 2018, confirming that Fandom would be migrating all wikis from the wikia.com domain, to fandom.com in early 2019, as part of a push for greater adoption of Fandom's wiki-specific applications on both iOS and Android's app ecosystems. The post was later deleted.

==== Wiki partnerships ====
Fandom has created several official partnerships to create wikis, vetted by the corporation as being the "official" encyclopedia or wiki of a property. In 2012, Fandom partnered with Sony Online Entertainment to create the first "Wikia Official Community" for PlanetSide 2, with the game's wiki slated to receive exclusive content and support. In 2014, Fandom partnered with Roddenberry Enterprises to create the Trek Initiative, a Fandom hosted wiki community site that features video interviews, promotions, and other material about Star Trek to celebrate its 50th anniversary. Fandom made similar partnerships with 2K Games during the launch of Civilization: Beyond Earth and Warner Bros Interactive for Shadow of Mordor. Fandom also has partnerships with Lionsgate Media to promote Starz and Film franchises through wiki content, fandom articles, and advertisements.

==== Esports ====
In 2021, the United States Navy hired Fandom to manage and promote esports tournaments and streams on Twitch.

==== Fandom Games (YouTube channel) ====
With Fandom's acquisition of Curse Media, the Curse Entertainment YouTube channel was renamed to Fandom Games. Fandom Games publishes Honest Game Trailers, which was previously published on the Smosh Games YouTube channel until Screen Junkies was acquired by Fandom.

=== Past services ===
==== OpenServing ====
OpenServing was a short-lived Web publishing project owned by Fandom, founded on December 12, 2006, and abandoned, unannounced, in January 2008. Like Fandom, OpenServing was to offer free wiki hosting, but it would differ in that each wiki's founder would retain any revenue gained from advertising on the site. OpenServing used a modified version of the Wikimedia Foundation's MediaWiki software created by ArmchairGM, but was intended to branch out to other open source packages.

According to Fandom co-founder and chairman Jimmy Wales, the OpenServing site received several thousand applications in January 2007. However, after a year, no sites had been launched under the OpenServing banner.

==== Armchair GM ====
ArmchairGM was a sports forum and wiki site created by Aaron Wright, Dan Lewis, Robert Lefkowitz, and developer David Pean. Launched in early 2006, the site was initially US-based but sought to improve its links to sports associated with Britain over its first year. Its MediaWiki-based software included a Digg-style article-voting mechanism, blog-like comment forms with "thumbs up/down" user feedback, and the ability to write multiple types of posts (news, opinions, or "locker room" discussion entries).

In late 2006, the site was bought by Fandom for $2 million. After the purchase was made, the former owners applied ArmchairGM's architecture to other Fandom sites. However, Wikia had "dropped support" for the custom software innovations by ArmchairGM by January 2010. From September 2010 to February 2011, Fandom absorbed ArmchairGM's encyclopedia articles and blanked all of its old blog entries, effectively discontinuing ArmchairGM in its original form.

The software powering ArmchairGM was incrementally open-sourced starting in February 2008 with the public release of the SocialProfile MediaWiki extension. This process was complete by August 2011, when the original ArmchairGM codebase (internally codenamed wikia-ny) was released in full. Since 2008 the ArmchairGM innovations, nicknamed "social tools", have been developed by volunteer developers of the MediaWiki community and they are available under the GNU General Public License, version 2 or later, which is a free and open-source software license. The source code is hosted on the Wikimedia Foundation's web servers and mirrored to the popular source code hosting platform GitHub.

==== Search engines ====
Wikia, Inc. initially proposed creating a copyleft search engine; the software (but not the site) was named "Wikiasari" by a November 2004 naming contest. (Note: The name was derived from the Hawaiian word for "quick" and asari, stem of the Japanese verb asaru, "to rummage".) The proposal became inactive in 2005. The "public alpha" of the Wikia Search web search engine was launched on January 7, 2008, from the USSHC underground data center. This roll-out version of the search interface was roundly panned by reviewers in technology media. The project was ended in March 2009. Late in 2009, a new search engine was established to index and display results from all sites hosted on Fandom.

==== Questions and answers site ====
In January 2009, the company created a question and answer website named "Wikianswers" (not to be confused with the preexisting WikiAnswers). In March 2010, Fandom re-launched "Answers from Wikia", where users could create topic-specialized knowledge market wikis based upon Fandom's own Wikianswers subdomain.

== Controversies ==
=== Relationship with Wikipedia ===
In the 2000s, Fandom, then called Wikia, was accused of unduly profiting from a perceived association with Wikipedia. Although Fandom has been referred to in the media as "the commercial counterpart to the non-profit Wikipedia", Wikimedia and Fandom staff call this description inaccurate.

In 2006, the Wikimedia Foundation shared hosting and bandwidth costs with Wikia, and received some donated office space from Wikia during the fiscal year ending June 30, 2006. At the end of the fiscal year 2007, Wikia owed the foundation $6,000. In June 2007, two members of the foundation's board of directors also served as employees, officers, or directors of Wikia. In January 2009, Wikia subleased two conference rooms to the Wikimedia Foundation for the Wikipedia Usability Initiative. According to a 2009 email by Erik Möller, deputy director of the Wikimedia Foundation:

We obtained about a dozen bids... We used averaging as a way to arrive at a fair market rate to neither advantage nor disadvantage Wikia when suggesting a rate. The averaging also resulted in a rate that was roughly equivalent to the most comparable space in the running.

=== Advertising controversies ===
Fandom communities have complained of inappropriate advertisements, resource-intensive advertisements, or advertising in the body text area. Users have also complained that the advertisements are so resource-intensive and hindering, that they have no choice but to use an ad-blocker to continue using the website. The quantity of advertisements displayed negatively affects the website's performance, especially when viewed on mobile devices. A report published by Emarketer in mid-2025 about the marketshare of Fandom noted the presence of malvertising within the platform, where there were occasions when ads embedded in wiki pages could redirect to suspicious sites.

The excessive monetization model of user-generated content has been criticized by several newspaper outlets, such as the British newspaper The Guardian, who argue that editors do not receive any benefits or rights in return for the content they contribute to the platform. Likewise, the Journal of Student Research has called Fandom exploitative and argued that its practices have formed an informational monopoly, making it harder for other sites to compete with them. Other concerns were also raised about Fandom's extensive commercialization of user-generated content, where the use of a for-profit model has undermined the quality of part of its database as well as trust in online spaces.

In 2021, Fandom began collaborating with the US Army and Navy Esports division, where the company began embedding streams on most of its wiki pages. The collaboration drew criticism because Fandom was using "view botting" techniques to artificially inflate views of the US Army and Navy streams and recommend content from a channel that had previously been criticized as government propaganda.

In August 2024, the publishing company Adalytics released a report indicating the presence of major brand advertisements in wiki articles containing obscene material including articles containing racial slurs towards Black people and white supremacist material, as well as content promoting sexual assault on several small wikis hosted by Fandom. The AI system used by Fandom supplemented by DoubleVerify and Integral Ad Science was criticized for displaying ads on malicious content.

In early 2025, Le Monde, one of the largest French newspapers, published an article on how Fandom was becoming a monopoly and affecting the circulation of information online as part of its "Pixels" section, which documents video game development. Reporters noted that the company was employing tactics to undermine competition, such as acquiring competing platforms like Gamepedia to reduce the chances of alternatives. Additionally, the newspaper noted that new services were created by former Fandom writers, administrators, and employees, such as wiki.gg and Weird Gloop after multiple conflicts with the company, such as poor communication and a lack of transparency, which caused developers such as Mojang to stop supporting the Minecraft wiki in 2022 after concerns that the company was prioritizing profits over the quality of information, as well as the spread of false data using artificial intelligence and the promotion of dead wikis containing outdated information with the aim of increase ad revenue.

=== Editorial interference ===
Fandom can alter user-generated content by incorporating obstructive elements without prior consultation with users, such as adding popups to customize ads, promoting unrelated articles, which may have questionable topics, and incorporation of unrelated quizzes to boost engagement. In addition, Fandom may arbitrarily remove content without prior consultation with the editors involved.

In 2017, Fandom began incorporating autoplaying videos into different wikis about video game franchises such as RuneScape and Fallout. This feature was implemented without prior consultation of the editors responsible for the maintenance of the wikis, and was criticized for undermining the quality standards of the site. During the same period, most of the editorial team behind Yu-Gi-Oh Wiki decided to move to a new project called Yugipedia when Fandom forced autoplaying videos on its pages, with some editors citing that Fandom's video production team had plagiarized content from other fan-made resources in order to increase profits.

In 2018, much of the Nukapedia editorial team expressed that Fandom was beginning to embed trailers and autoplay videos on all of its pages without their consent or prior approval. Several veteran editors had complained that the Fandom team was embedding low-quality content on their pages, including videos that took information from other sources without attribution, and some users were concerned that the company was starting to embed clickbait to generate more ad revenue.

In 2021, Fandom began removing and censoring adult material, including the deletion of entire wikis dedicated to documenting pieces of media with adult content. These measures were criticized by users as well as editors following the implementation of these guidelines without prior notice from the company.

In 2022, Fandom merged several wikis specializing in documenting sexuality and gender, including the deletion of several pages without prior consultation by users. These actions were criticized after the incorporation of material offensive to intersex identities and changes in editorial direction to make it more "corporate friendly". Additionally, critics who voiced their disapproval after the merge of the LGBTQIA wikis were blocked on both social media as well as on the Fandom wiki following the controversy. In the same year, the editorial team behind the Zelda Wiki clarified that one of the reasons they decided to move to an independent host was due to concerns about "corporate consolidation" and how their experience at Fandom had limited some of their editorial independence. The team of editors urged other communities to migrate some of their content, and urged Fandom employees to create a writers' union.

In 2023, Fandom introduced AI-generated content in the form of "Quick Answers" to different wikis. This content consisted of grammatical mistakes as well as factual errors and was subsequently removed after public backlash by editors and users. In an article published by Game Developer, the editorial team behind the Hollow Knight Wiki explained that one of the reasons they chose to migrate their content was due to Fandom's attempts to introduce generative AI into their articles, causing them to contain misinformation with the aim of increasing revenue, as well as concerns that the company is opting to use generative AI to replace human writers and artists. In the same year, Polygon released a report on how large video game communities were increasingly leaving for-profit platforms such as Fandom and Fextralife, the latter owned by Valnet. Citing examples such as the creation of the Nintendo Independent Wiki Alliance (NIWA) in 2010, which was created specifically to avoid corporate control within its databases, as well as the creation of an independent wiki for Baldur's Gate 3, which cited a certain distrust of Fandom's monetization and how it was using SEO optimization to crush the competition.

In May 2025, Fandom introduced "brand safety" guidelines to Giant Bomb. Such measures were criticized and mocked by the website staff in a podcast. Subsequently, Jeff Grubb clarified in several podcasts that Fandom would have removed the videos where contributors mocked the new guidelines imposed by the company. Following conflicts with Giant Bomb staff, former contributors such as Alex Navarro expressed Fandom's lack of professionalism in handling the situation, describing it as "cruel even by most corporate standards" after the company's poor treatment of journalists and writers. Additionally, journalists such as Dan Ryckert, who had worked on the website for more than a decade, had no intention of following Fandom's model for the website, which had many restrictions that undermined the editorial independence of the website in order to make it more profitable for advertisers.

In March 2026, part of the GTA Wiki editorial team clarified that one of the reasons they decided to migrate their content to Weird Gloop was due to concerns that Fandom would use some of their content to create AI tools without their consent following the arrival of a new "pro-AI" CEO, as well as the fact that Fandom has imposed significant restrictions on how content can be cataloged, censoring any content containing offensive language or graphic imagery.

=== Privacy concerns ===
Fandom has been subject to several lawsuits in the State of California following data collection in violation of the Video Privacy Protection Act, where the website shared user information without prior consent such as IP addresses and viewing habits to third-party companies such as Meta. Lawsuits regarding privacy violations against Fandom began in 2022 following reports that the company was selling sensitive information to external platforms. Later in 2023, a federal judge in California clarified that Fandom cannot evade lawsuits regarding data sharing filed by consumers.

In December 2025, following a California court ruling, the company was forced to compensate approximately 860,000 people for damages caused by invasion of privacy and data leaks to third parties due to online trackers used on websites owned by the company, with an estimated $1.2 million to remedy the damages caused by violation of consumers' privacy rights.

=== Copyright infringement and plagiarism ===
The company had previously been sued in several district courts in California for copyright infringement regarding the unauthorized use of images created from professional photographers on its website, including lawsuits by photographer Linda Matlow for the use of material from her professional catalog and film director Michael Grecco for the use of promotional imagery taken for The X-Files.

In June 2026, several editors behind the Independent GTA Wiki, hosted on Weird Gloop, publicly reported Fandom staff of plagiarism, presenting evidence that employees who were directly paid by the company were copying several articles without any proper attribution, including information that contained errors and typos, after the vast majority of users had left the project. The company's actions sparked controversy on social media regarding their work ethic and integrity because it was using paid staff to copy entire articles written by volunteers and hobbyists who were not economically compensated at all, with the aim of monetizing Fandom's outdated version.

One of the affected editors publicly clarified to media outlets that "We don't have the money to escalate this any further. Since Fandom is apparently unwilling to follow the law for clear-cut copyright violations, the next-best-thing I can hope is that this cartoonishly evil business practice gets more attention".

=== Misinformation ===
At the end of 2024, several fact-checking organizations such as AFP Fact Check and Media Matters for America reported that certain Fandom wikis were being used by people to spread misinformation and conspiracy theories following an error by Amazon Alexa that redirected to a fictional article about Hurricane Milton, which devastated part of the United States. Additionally, fact-checking agencies clarify that people should be cautious when considering information from the website as reliable, as it comes from user-generated sources and contain mistakes regarding real life events. Company representatives had to remove the article after the backlash.

=== Grimace Shake advertisement controversy ===
In June 2023, McDonald's paid Fandom an undisclosed amount to temporarily replace the McDonald's Wiki's main page and exhaustive article on Grimace with an advertisement promoting the Grimace Shake and the character's 52nd anniversary. The article's primary contributor, Nathan Steinmetz, complained that the decision undermined his research and efforts and considered Fandom to have set a "really bad precedent" of IP holders' ability to suppress user-generated content with press releases.

=== Wiki departures ===
A number of wikis have migrated away from Fandom, citing issues such as intrusive advertising and branding, a non-user-friendly site design, a lack of customizability and company cross-promotion which is often irrelevant to wiki content. One of the earliest examples was the Transformers Wiki, which migrated in 2008 due to disagreements with Fandom—then Wikia—staff regarding intrusive advertising. Other communities, such as the Zelda Wiki and Minecraft Wiki, have named the increasing "corporate consolidation" of wikis, alleged censorship, Fandom's "degraded" functionality and the Grimace controversy among their reasons for migrating. Covering the Minecraft Wiki's departure for PC Gamer, Rich Stanton stated that most of the migrations began after the 2018 acquisition and Gamepedia's move to Fandom. He noted that the Minecraft Wiki would have to compete with Fandom's better search engine optimization (SEO) and would have a struggle to establish a wider audience after moving. In 2023, Fandom CEO Perkins Miller told The Verge that he takes wiki migration "very seriously".

Some of the more high-profile wikis which have migrated from Fandom include the RuneScape wiki in 2018, the Zelda and Terraria wikis in 2022, the Minecraft, Fallout and Hollow Knight wikis in 2023, the South Park, Dead by Daylight and League of Legends wikis in 2024, and the Warframe, Vampire Survivors, Undertale/Deltarune, Nichijou and Balatro wikis in 2025. Additionally, in that same year, the editorial team behind the Ys, Trails, Xanadu and Gagharv wikis decided to migrate their content en masse to independent platforms in order to create a more comprehensive repository of games developed by Nihon Falcom, citing issues such as intrusive advertisements on the platform. Some wikis have received support from the creators of their topic areas during migration.

In March 2026, the Grand Theft Auto wiki moved to an independent domain previously owned by GTANET, one of the largest information sites for the franchise that currently operates GTAForums, citing that the company's new policies made it difficult to maintain the quality of articles due to censorship of certain explicit dialogue used in the games. In May 2026, a large portion of the VALORANT Wiki team moved to Weird Gloop, citing dissatisfaction with Fandom's policies as well as a negative perception of certain practices involving excessive monetization. The migration was supported by Riot Games, which certified the wiki as official and provided financial backing; however, the company clarified that it would not interfere with the site's content or guidelines in order to grant writers creative freedom.

==== Forking ====
There is no easy way for individual communities to switch to conventional paid hosting, as Fandom usually owns the relevant domain names. When a community leaves Fandom for new hosting, Fandom typically continues to operate the abandoned ("forked") wiki using its original name and content for advertising revenue as long as editing and viewership remains. This can adversely affect the new wiki's search rankings, potentially also resulting in outdated or incorrect information being present and viewed more often than the information on the new wiki. Fandom allows only a message directing viewers to a discussion about whether to fork for as long as the discussion is active before the message is removed, and any administrators involved in the new wiki have their rights on the Fandom wiki removed.

== Fandom, Inc. ==
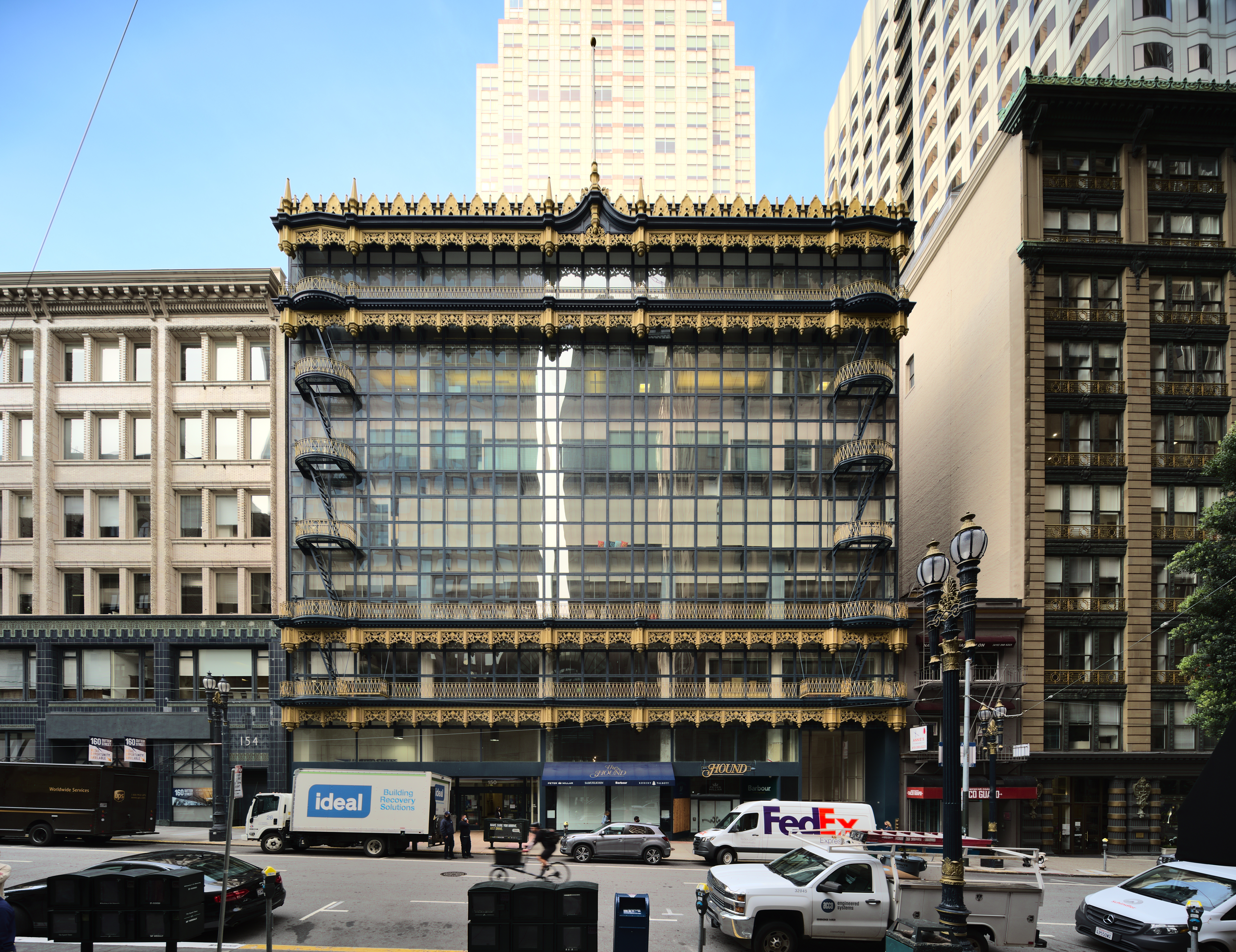
Hallidie Building in San Francisco, current Fandom headquarters

The overall parent company, Fandom, Inc., is headquartered at the Hallidie Building on 130 Sutter Street in San Francisco, California. The company was incorporated in Florida in December 2004 and re-incorporated in Delaware as Wikia, Inc. on January 10, 2006.

Fandom has technical staff in the US, but also has an office in Poznań, Poland, where the primary engineering functions are performed.

Fandom derives income from advertising. The company initially used Google AdSense but moved on to Federated Media before bringing ad management in-house. Alongside Fandom's in-house advertising, they continue to use AdSense as well as Amazon Ads and several other third-party advertising services. Fandom also gains income from various partnerships oriented around various sweepstake sponsorships on related wikis.

Fandom has several other offices. International operations are based in Germany, and Asian operations and sales are conducted in Tokyo. Other sales offices are located in Chicago, Latin America, Los Angeles (marketing programming and content), New York City, and London.

== See also ==
- Comparison of wiki hosting services
