= List of personal information managers =

The following is a list of personal information managers (PIMs) and online organizers.

== Applications ==
| PIM application | Platform(s) | Software license | Notes |
|---|---|---|---|
| 3D Topicscape | Windows | Commercial | organizes information into 3D landscapes |
| Calendar | macOS | Commercial | Included with macOS |
| Outlook Calendar on Outlook.com | Web | Freeware | Has a freeware offline client, Calendar (Windows) |
| Gubb | Web | Freeware | |
| CintaNotes | Windows | Freemium | organizes information as notes, grouped using tags |
| eM Client | Windows | Freemium | Personal information manager, Email client, Calendaring software |
| Evernote | macOS, Windows, Web, Android | Commercial | |
| Evolution | Linux, Unix, GNOME | GPL | Included with GNOME |
| Google Calendar | Web | Freeware | |
| GroupWise | Linux, macOS, Windows, Web | Commercial | |
| IBM Notes | Linux, macOS, Windows | Commercial | |
| Joplin | Linux, macOS, Microsoft Windows, Android, iOS | AGPL | Note taking application organised as notebooks. Can import and export from Evernote |
| Kontact | Linux, Windows, Unix, macOS, KDE | GPL | Included with KDE |
| Leo | Linux, Windows, macOS | MIT | Python-scriptable folding editor/IDE organized around multiple views (clones) of underlying text spread across files. Inspired by literate programming and similar to org-mode. |
| Lightning | Linux, Windows, macOS, others | MPL, GPL, LGPL | Addon for the Thunderbird e-mail client |
| Microsoft Outlook | Windows, macOS | Commercial | |
| mobile PhoneTools | Windows | Commercial | |
| MyInfo | Windows | Commercial | Free form personal information manager |
| Notion | Cross-platform | Commercial | |
| Obsidian | Cross-platform | Freeware | Personal Knowledge Base |
| OneNote | Windows, macOS, Web, Android, Windows Phone | Freeware | Notes manager |
| org-mode | Cross-platform | GPL | Integrates with Emacs BBDB for contact management support, web browsers for hyperlink storing support. Free iPhone and Android apps available (Orgzly, MobileOrg and Beorg) |
| Personal Knowbase | Windows | Commercial | Freeform note-taking organizer. Portable. |
| Planz | Windows | MIT | Provides a single, integrative document-like view of personal information as an overlay to the user's file system. |
| Remember the Milk | Web | Freemium | |
| Tabbles | Windows | Freemium | Tagging and auto-tagging of files, emails and bookmarks. Tag-sharing for files on shared-drives or in the Cloud. |
| TagSpaces | Cross-platform | AGPL | Offline application for PC, smartphone or tablet. Personal "wiki" for project tracking and storage of information. |
| Taskwarrior | Linux, semi-cross-platform (Windows Subsystem for Linux, Cygwin) | MIT | Time and task management tool with command-line interface. |
| Things | macOS | Commercial | Task management and scheduling |
| TiddlyWiki | Cross-platform | BSD 3-clause | Single HTML file application used directly in browser that facilitates content reuse. |
| Tinderbox | macOS | Commercial | |
| TopXNotes | macOS | Commercial | Hybrid personal note and information organizer |
| Treasuremytext | Cross-platform | Commercial | Archiving personal messages |
| Whizfolders | Windows | Commercial | Hybrid Note-taking software and outliner |
| Windows Contacts | Windows | Commercial | Included with Windows 7, 8 and 10 |
| Wrike | Web | Commercial | |
| Yahoo! Calendar | Web | Freeware | |
| Yojimbo | macOS | Commercial | "Personal information manager" |
| Zim | Cross-platform | GPL | Graphical text editor designed to maintain a collection of locally stored wiki-pages. |
| SuperMemo | Windows | Commercial (with freeware older versions) | Spaced repetition, Incremental reading, Task management and more. |
| TheBrain | Cross-platform | Freemium | Personal knowledge base that uses a dynamic graphical interface that maps hierarchical and network relationships. Like a Knowledge Graph. |

== Discontinued applications ==
| PIM application | Platform(s) | Software license | Notes |
|---|---|---|---|
| askSam | DOS, Windows | Commercial | Free form database |
| Backpack | Web | Commercial | Todo list and calendar |
| Chandler | Linux, OS X, Windows | Apache | Free form approach based on Lotus Agenda |
| ClarisOrganizer | macOS | Commercial | organized Events, Tasks, Notes, Contacts |
| Ecco Pro | Windows | Freeware | organizes information via full power outline and tag assignments. (Tags can contain text, numeric, or date data. Date data automatically mapped to calendar.) |
| Google Notebook | Web | Freeware | deprecated by Google Docs, Google Keep |
| Haystack | all operating systems with POSIX and Java | MIT | |
| Hula | Linux | GPL | Replaced by Bongo project |
| IBM Lotus Organizer | Windows | Commercial | 2003–2013 |
| ideaList | DOS, Windows, Mac | Commercial | Free form database |
| Lotus Agenda | DOS | Freeware | deprecated by IBM Lotus Organizer |
| Meeting Maker | Linux, OS X, Solaris | Commercial | |
| Microsoft Entourage | OS X | Commercial | deprecated by Microsoft Outlook for Mac |
| MORE, GrandView | Classic Mac OS, DOS | Commercial | 1986–1990 |
| Mozilla Calendar Project | Linux, BSD UNIX, OpenSolaris, Solaris, OS X, Windows, OS/2 | MPL | deprecated by Lightning |
| Mozilla Sunbird | Linux, BSD UNIX, OpenSolaris, Solaris, OS X, Windows, OS/2 | MPL, GPL, LGPL | deprecated by Lightning |
| Now Up-to-Date & Contact | Mac OS, Windows | Commercial | Event, Task and Contact Organizer |
| Palm Desktop | Mac OS, Windows | Commercial | |
| Plaxo | Web | Commercial | 2002-2017 |
| Sidekick | DOS, Windows | Commercial | 1983–1999 |

== See also ==
=== Comparisons ===
- Comparison of email clients
- Comparison of file managers
- Comparison of note-taking software
- Comparison of reference management software
- Comparison of text editors
- Comparison of wiki software
- Comparison of word processors

=== Lists ===
- List of outliners
- Comparison of project management software
- List of text editors
- List of wiki software
