= Personal knowledge management =

Process by which a person manages knowledge

Personal knowledge management (PKM) is a process of collecting information that a person uses to gather, classify, store, search, retrieve and share knowledge in their daily activities and the way in which these processes support work activities. It is a response to the idea that knowledge workers need to be responsible for their own growth and learning. It is a bottom-up approach to knowledge management (KM).

== History and background ==
Although as early as 1998 Davenport wrote on the importance to worker productivity of understanding individual knowledge processes, the term personal knowledge management appears to be relatively new. Its origin can be traced in a 1999 working paper by Frand & Hixon.

PKM integrates personal information management (PIM), focused on individual skills, with knowledge management (KM) in addition to input from a variety of disciplines such as cognitive psychology, management and philosophy. From an organizational perspective, understanding of the field has developed in light of expanding knowledge about human cognitive capabilities and the permeability of organizational boundaries. From a metacognitive perspective, it compares various modalities within human cognition as to their competence and efficacy. It is an under researched area. More recently, research has been conducted to help understand "the potential role of Web 2.0 technologies for harnessing and managing personal knowledge". The Great Resignation has expanded the category of knowledge workers and is predicted to increase demand for personal knowledge management in the future.

Frand and Hixson’s foundational 1998 paper helped popularize the concept by posing the core questions “Who? What? Why? When? Where? How?” of personal knowledge management.

== Models ==
Information retrieval, assessment and evaluation, organization, analysis, presentation, security, and collaboration are essential to PKM.

Wright's model involves four interrelated domains: analytical, information, social, and learning. The analytical domain involves competencies such as interpretation, envisioning, application, creation, and contextualization. The information dimension comprises the sourcing, assessment, organization, aggregation, and communication of information. The social dimension involves finding and collaborating with people, the development of both close networks and extended networks, and dialogue. The learning dimension entails expanding pattern recognition and sensemaking capabilities, reflection, development of new knowledge, improvement of skills, and extension to others. This model stresses the importance of both bonding and bridging networks.

In Nonaka and Takeuchi's SECI model of knowledge dimensions (see under knowledge management), knowledge can be tacit or explicit, with the interaction of the two resulting in new knowledge. Smedley has developed a PKM model based on Nonaka and colleagues' model in which an expert provides direction while a community of practice provides support for personal knowledge creation. Trust is central to knowledge sharing in this model. Nonaka has returned to his earlier work in an attempt to further develop his ideas about knowledge creation.

Personal knowledge management can also be viewed along two main dimensions, personal knowledge and personal management. Zhang has developed a model of PKM in relation to organizational knowledge management (OKM) that considers two axes of knowledge properties and management perspectives, either organizational or personal. These aspects of organizational and personal knowledge are interconnected through the OAPI process (organizationalize, aggregate, personalize, and individualize), whereby organizational knowledge is personalized and individualized, and personal knowledge is aggregated and operationalized as organizational knowledge.

A major edited collection examining PKM from individual, organizational, and social perspectives is the 2011 volume by Pauleen and Gorman. Cheong and Tsui (2011) reviewed a decade of PKM model development and identified a clear evolution from early competency-based frameworks toward more integrated, outcome-oriented approaches that link personal skills to collaborative work.

== Criticism ==
It is not clear whether PKM is anything more than a new wrapper around personal information management (PIM). William Jones argued that only personal information as a tangible resource can be managed, whereas personal knowledge cannot. Dave Snowden has asserted that most individuals cannot manage their knowledge in the traditional sense of "managing" and has advocated thinking in terms of sensemaking rather than PKM. Knowledge is not solely an individual product—it emerges through connections, dialog, and social interaction (see Sociology of knowledge). However, in Wright's model, PKM involves the application to problem-solving of analytical, information, social, and learning dimensions, which are interrelated, and so is inherently social.

An aim of PKM is "helping individuals to be more effective in personal, organizational and social environments", often through the use of technology such as networking software. It has been argued, however, that equation of PKM with technology has limited the value and utility of the concept.

In 2012, Mohamed Chatti introduced the personal knowledge network (PKN) model to KM as an alternative perspective on PKM, based on the concepts of a personal knowledge network and knowledge ecology.

Countering some of these critiques, Mittelmann (2016) argues that PKM serves as a necessary foundation for successful organizational knowledge management in the digital age, providing empirical support through case studies showing how individual PKM practices scale to enterprise level. Similarly, Pauleen and Gorman (2011) present a balanced view across multiple chapters that acknowledges the social and organizational dimensions of PKM while addressing concerns about its distinctiveness from personal information management.

== Skills ==
Skills associated with personal knowledge management include:

- Collaboration skills. Coordination, synchronization, experimentation, cooperation and design.
- Communication skills. Perception, intuition, expression, visualization and interpretation.
- Creative skills. Imagination, pattern recognition, appreciation, innovation, inference. Understanding of complex adaptive systems.
- Information literacy. Understanding what information is important and how to find unknown information.
- Manage learning. Manage how and when the individual learns.
- Networking with others. Knowing what your network of people knows. Knowing who might have additional knowledge and resources to help you
- Organizational skills. Personal librarianship. Personal categorization and taxonomies.
- Reflection. Continuous improvement on how the individual operates.
- Researching, canvassing, paying attention, interviewing and observational "cultural anthropology" skills

== Tools ==
Some organizations are introducing PKM "systems" with some or all four components:

- Content management: taxonomy processes and desktop search tools that enable employees to subscribe to, find, organize and publish information that resides on their desktops
- Just-in-time canvassing: templates and e-mail canvassing lists that enable people to identify and connect with the appropriate experts and expertise quickly and effectively
- Knowledge harvesting: software tools that automatically collect appropriate knowledge residing on subject matter experts' hard drives
- Personal productivity improvement: knowledge fairs and 101 training sessions to help each employee make more effective personal use of the knowledge, learning, and technology resources available in the context of their work

PKM has also been linked to these tools:

- Email, calendars, task managers
- Knowledge logs (k-logs)
- Social bookmarking and enterprise bookmarking
- Virtual assistants
- Wikis, including personal wikis and semantic wikis
- Web annotations

Other useful tools include stories and narrative inquiry, decision support systems, various kinds of node–link diagram (such as argument maps, mind maps, concept maps), and similar information visualization techniques. Individuals use these tools to capture ideas, expertise, experience, opinions or thoughts, and this "voicing" will encourage cognitive diversity and promote free exchanges away from a centralized policed knowledge repository. The goal is to facilitate knowledge sharing and personal content management.

Some examples of PKM tools include:

- Logseq
- Notion
- remio
- Obsidian
- Roam
- Tana
- TiddlyWiki
- Zim
- Joplin
- Anytype
- Zettlr

Recent scholarship emphasizes practical implementation of PKM tools. Reck (2023) provides evidence-based tips for building functional academic PKM systems, highlighting the importance of consistent capture routines and tool interoperability. Fathizargan (2017) developed a Web 2.0 skill framework showing how tools such as wikis, social bookmarking, and digital collaboration platforms enable effective information filtering, knowledge sharing, and networked learning.

== See also ==
- Adaptive hypermedia
- Card file
- Commonplace book
- Drakon-chart
- Memex
- Semantic desktop
- User modeling
