= Personal knowledge base =

Knowledge management software

A personal knowledge base (PKB) is an electronic tool used by an individual to express, capture, and later retrieve personal knowledge. (Note: Following Davies, Velez-Morales & King (2005) and Davies (2011), a PKB can be described using the metaphor of a container: a PKB is both the container (a software system, called a PKB system) and the content (recorded knowledge or information) contained within it.) It differs from a traditional database in that it contains subjective material particular to the owner, that others may not agree with nor care about. Importantly, a PKB consists primarily of knowledge, rather than information; in other words, it is not a collection of documents or other sources an individual has encountered, but rather an expression of the distilled knowledge the owner has extracted from those sources or from elsewhere.

The term personal knowledge base was mentioned as early as the 1980s, but the term came to prominence in the 2000s when it was described at length in publications by computer scientist Stephen Davies and colleagues, who compared PKB systems on a number of different dimensions, the most important of which is the data model that each PKB system uses to organize knowledge.

== Data models ==
Davies and colleagues examined three aspects of the data models of PKB systems:

- their structural framework, which prescribes rules about how knowledge elements can be structured and interrelated (as a tree, graph, tree plus graph, spatially, categorically, as n-ary links, chronologically, or ZigZag);
- their knowledge elements, or basic building blocks of information that a user creates and works with, and the level of granularity of those knowledge elements (such as word/concept, phrase/proposition, free text notes, links to information sources, or composite); and
- their schema, which involves the level of formal semantics introduced into the data model (such as a type system and related schemas, keywords, attribute–value pairs, etc.).

Davies and colleagues also emphasized the principle of transclusion, "the ability to view the same knowledge element (not a copy) in multiple contexts", which they considered to be "pivotal" to an ideal PKB system. They concluded, after reviewing many design goals, that the ideal PKB system was still to come in the future.

=== Personal knowledge graph ===
In their publications on PKBs, Davies and colleagues discussed knowledge graphs as they were implemented in some software of the time. Later, other writers used the term personal knowledge graph (PKG) to refer to a PKB system featuring a graph structure and graph visualization. However, the term personal knowledge graph is also used by software engineers to refer to the different subject of a knowledge graph about a person, in contrast to a knowledge graph created by a person in a PKB.

== Software architecture ==
Davies and colleagues also differentiated PKB systems according to their software architecture: file-based, database-based, or client–server systems (including Internet-based systems accessed through desktop computers and/or handheld mobile devices).

== History ==
Non-electronic personal knowledge bases have probably existed in some form for centuries: Leonardo da Vinci's journals and notes are a famous example of the use of notebooks. Commonplace books, florilegia, annotated private libraries, and card files (in German, Zettelkästen) of index cards and edge-notched cards are examples of formats that have served this function in the pre-electronic age.

Undoubtedly the most famous early formulation of an electronic PKB system was Vannevar Bush's description of the "memex" in 1945. In a 1962 technical report, human–computer interaction pioneer Douglas Engelbart (who would later become famous for his 1968 "Mother of All Demos" that demonstrated almost all the fundamental elements of modern personal computing) described his use of edge-notched cards to partially model Bush's memex.

== Examples ==
The following software applications have been used to build PKBs using various data models and architectures. The list includes software mentioned by Davies and colleagues in their 2005 paper, and additional software.

Open source

- Compendium
- Haystack (MIT project)
- Joplin
- Logseq
- NoteCards
- Org-mode
- QOwnNotes
- TiddlyWiki

Closed source

- Evernote
- Microsoft OneNote
- MindManager
- MyLifeBits
- Notion
- Obsidian
- Personal Knowbase
- PersonalBrain
- Roam
- Tinderbox

== See also ==
- Computer-assisted qualitative data analysis software – Type of software
- Information system – System that supports business decisions
- Issue-based information system – Argumentation scheme
- Lifelog – Personal record of one's daily life
- Notetaking – Practice of recording information
  - Comparison of notetaking software
- Outliner – Type of software to organize texts
- Personal knowledge management – Process by which a person manages knowledge
- Personal wiki
  - List of wiki software § Personal wiki software
- Tag (metadata) § Knowledge tags
