= Comparison of note-taking software =

Comparison of computer software designed for taking notes

The tables below compare features of notable note-taking software. These comparisons highlight differences in platform availability, synchronization capabilities, formatting options, storage limits, and integration with other applications. While some applications like Microsoft OneNote and Evernote offer robust features with cloud syncing across devices, others such as Simplenote prioritize minimalism and speed. Open-source tools like Joplin provide privacy-focused alternatives, allowing users to host their own notes and use end-to-end encryption. These tables aim to help users choose a note-taking tool that best fits their workflow, whether for academic, personal, or professional use.

The tables below compare features of notable note-taking software.

== General information ==
Name	Developer(s)	License	Platforms
AllMyNotes Organizer	Vladonai Software	Freemium	Microsoft Windows
Bear	Shiny Frog	Freemium	macOS, iOS
CintaNotes	Cinta Software	Freemium	Microsoft Windows
ConnectedText	Eduardo Mauro	Shareware	Microsoft Windows
Day One	Bloom Built (Automattic)	Proprietary commercial	macOS, iOS, Android
Dropbox Paper	Dropbox	Freemium	Android, iOS, web-based
Evernote	Evernote Corporation	Freemium	Android, iOS, macOS, Microsoft Windows 7/8/10, Microsoft Windows Phone, and web-based
Gnote	Aurimas Černius	GPL-3.0-or-later	Linux
Google Keep	Google	Freeware	Android, iOS, ChromeOS, browser based
Joplin	laurent22 et al.	AGPL-3.0 or later	Microsoft Windows, macOS, Linux, iOS, Android
KeyNote	Marek Jedliński, Tranglos Software	MPL-2.0	Microsoft Windows
Logseq	Logseq Inc	AGPL-3.0 or later	Windows, macOS, Android, Linux, iOS, BSD
Memonic	Nektoon AG	Freemium (Note: Free users limited to 100 notes.)	Android (not released yet), iOS, macOS, Microsoft Windows XP/Vista/7/Mobile web-based
Microsoft OneNote	Microsoft	Freemium (Note: Depends on platform and version.)	Android, macOS, iOS, Microsoft Windows (desktop and mobile), PWA
MyInfo	Milenix Software	Shareware	Microsoft Windows
MyNotex	Massimo Nardello	GPL-3.0-or-later	Linux
Notational Velocity	Zachary Schneirov	GPL-3.0-or-later	macOS
Notes	Apple	Proprietary commercial	macOS, iOS, web-based
Notion	Notion Labs Inc.	Freemium	Android, macOS, iOS (iPad, iPhone), Microsoft Windows, web-based
Notesnook	Streetwriters (Private) Limited.	Freemium	Android, macOS, iOS (iPad, iPhone), Microsoft Windows, web-based
Obsidian	Dynalist Inc.	Freemium	Linux, macOS, Microsoft Windows, iOS, Android
Open-Sankoré	Sankoré	LGPL-2.0-only	Linux, macOS, Unix, Microsoft Windows
Org-mode (Emacs)	Carsten Dominik, et al.	GPL-3.0-or-later	Linux, macOS, Unix, Microsoft Windows
PDF Studio	Qoppa Software	Shareware	Linux, macOS, Microsoft Windows, web-based
Personal Knowbase	Bitsmith Software	Proprietary commercial	Microsoft Windows
QOwnNotes	Patrizio Bekerle it	GPL-2.0-only	Linux, macOS, Microsoft Windows
Qiqqa	Quantisle Ltd.	Freemium	Microsoft Windows XP/Vista/7/8, Web-based, Android
Roam	Roam Research	Proprietary commercial	macOS, Linux, Microsoft Windows
Samsung Notes	Samsung Electronics	Proprietary commercial	Android, Microsoft Windows
Simplenote	Automattic inc.	Clients: GPL-2.0-only	Web app
TagSpaces	TagSpaces UG	AGPL-3.0-only	Web app
TiddlyWiki	Jeremy Ruston	BSD-3-Clause	Cross-platform (single HTML file, runs in browser, on a nodeJS server, on Android and IOS)
Tomboy	Alex Graveley	LGPL-2.1-only	Cross-platform (Mono/GTK+)
Ulysses	The Soulmen	Shareware	macOS, iOS
Whizfolders	AvniTech Solutions	Proprietary commercial	Microsoft Windows
Microsoft Windows Journal	Microsoft	Proprietary commercial	Windows XP Tablet PC edition, Windows Vista through Windows 10 v1511
Zettlr	Hendrik Erz	GPL-3.0-or-later	macOS, Microsoft Windows, Linux
Zim	Jaap Karssenberg	GPL-2.0-or-later	Cross-platform (Python, GTK+)
ZOHO Notebook	ZOHO Corporation	Freemium	Web app

== Basic features ==
Name	Organizing principle(s)	Outline bulleting with indent	Tabbed sections	Sync	Web Clipping	PDF annotate and save (Note: [unclear])	Whiteboarding	Ink-pen input	Handwriting recognition	Spell check	Search	Replace in note	Printing	File save/export/import formats
AllMyNotes Organizer	Tree	Yes	No	Yes	?	No	No	No	No	Yes	Yes	?	Yes	Proprietary, encrypted; import: plain text, RTF, CSV, images, HTML; exports: plain text, HTML, RTF, images
Bear	tags	Yes	No	Yes	Yes	No	Yes	Yes	No	Yes	Yes	Yes	Yes	Proprietary, encrypted; export: plain text, markdown, textbundle, RTF, HTML, DOCX, PDF, JPG, ePub
CintaNotes	Notebooks, sections, tags	Yes	Yes	Yes	?	No	No	No	No	No	Yes	?	Yes	Proprietary; export to Unicode text, XML and HTML
ConnectedText	Wiki, Tree and Categories	Yes	Yes	No	?	No	No	No	No	Yes	Yes	?	Yes	Proprietary (SQL); Export to text, XML, CHM and HTML. Import from text, HTML, XML and RTF
Day One	Chronological, tags	Yes	No	Yes (Note: Data is synced between devices by Dropbox or iCloud.)	?	No	No	No	No	Yes	Yes	?	Yes (Note: Printable via exported pdf files.)	Markdown (in GUI), XML (data file); Export as: pdf, txt, md
Evernote	tags, Notebooks, Stacks	Yes	No	Yes	Yes	Yes	No	Partial (Note: No support for ink notes in Mac version. Cannot mix ink with text)	Yes	Yes	Yes	Yes	Yes	Imports and exports in Evernote XML.
Gnote	Notebooks	?	No	Yes	?	Yes	No	?	?	Yes	Yes	?	Yes	NoteXmlFormat, HTML, PDF
Google Keep	tags, colors	No	No	Yes	Partial (Note: Clips URLs and titles only. Web page content is not clipped)	No	Yes	No	?	Partial (Note: On Android and ChromeOS uses platform's spell checker.)	Yes	?	No	Proprietary; export to Google Doc and thence to PDF, Word, ODT etc.
Joplin	Nested notebooks, tree, tags	Yes	No	Yes	Browser Extension	No	No	Plug-In	No	Yes	Yes	Plug-In	Yes	Import/Export: JEX (Proprietary), RAW (Proprietary, directory), Markdown (optionally with front matter); Export: HTML, PDF; Import: Evernote ENEX
KeyNote NF	Notebooks, notes and tree	Yes	Yes	No	?	No	No	No	No	Yes	Yes	?	Yes	Internal: combination of TXT and RTF; import/export: TXT, RTF, HTML, Treepad
Logseq	Notebooks, journal pages, blocks and pages	Yes	Yes	Yes	?	No	Yes	Yes	No	Yes	Yes	Yes	Yes	Internal: There are two versions of the software: a markdown version and a database version; export: PDF, HTML.
Memonic	?	?	No	Yes	?	Yes	No	No	?	?	?	?	Yes	Notes stored as XML; can attach any filetype
Microsoft OneNote	Notebooks, notebook sections, section groups, tags (could be applied to content blocks)	Yes	Yes	Yes (Note: All versions can sync with OneDrive and SharePoint. Versions later than Office 2016 can only use online notebooks and cannot use local notebooks.)	Yes	Yes (Note: OneNote 2010 and OneNote 2007 Service Pack 2 and beyond have it built in. A Save As PDF add-in is available for earlier versions of OneNote 2007. Can save to PDF with add-in.)	Yes	Yes	Yes	Yes	Yes	No	Yes	Imports: Evernote XML. Exports: OneNote binary format.
MyInfo	Notebooks, sections, notes, tree, tags, custom attributes	Yes	Yes	No	Yes	Yes	No	No	No	Yes	Yes	Yes	Yes	Proprietary, encrypted; import: plain text, RTF, CSV, MS Word, TreePad, images, web pages; exports: plain text, HTML, RTF, CSV, MS Word, TreePad
MyNotex	?	?	?	Yes	?	No	No	No	No	?	Yes	?	Yes	Sqlite based, zipped attachments; export to HTML; copying as LaTeX; import text files, OpenOffice.org documents
Notes	notes, tree, tags	Yes	?	Yes	Yes	?	?	Yes	Yes	Yes	Yes	Yes	Yes	Sqlite based; export to PDF
Notion	Notebooks, notebook sections, section	Yes	Yes	Yes	Partial	Yes (Note: Saved in separate file.)	No	No	No	Yes	Yes	?	Yes	Proprietary; export to PDF, HTML, Markdown, CSV
Obsidian	Wiki, Tree and Categories	Yes	Yes	Yes	Yes	Plug-In	No	Plug-In	No	Yes	Yes	Yes	Yes	Markdown, PDF
Okular	?	?	?	No	?	Yes	No	No	No	?	?	?	Yes	PDF, PS, TIFF, CHM, DjVu, DVI, XPS, ODF, others; export PDF+notes for sending to other Okular users
Open-Sankoré	tree, notebooks	No	No	No	?	Yes	Yes	Yes	No	No	No	?	Yes	Save/export: PDF, IWB, UBZ; Import: PDF, IWB, UBZ, images, image directories
Org-mode (Emacs)	tree, tags	Yes	Yes	Yes	Yes	Yes	Plug-In	Plug-In	No	Yes	Yes	Yes	Yes	LaTeX, HTML, DocBook, Taskjuggler, PDF, Freemind, XOXO, iCalendar
PDF Studio	?	?	?	?	?	Yes	No	?	?	?	?	?	Yes	PDF
Personal Knowbase	tags	?	?	?	?	No	No	?	?	?	?	?	Yes	Export to RTF, HTML, TXT, CSV
Qiqqa	tags, brainstorm	No	No	Yes	?	Yes	No	Yes	No	No	Yes	?	Yes	Proprietary, PDF, Brainstorm; export to RTF and Word
Samsung Notes		Yes	?	Yes	?	Yes	Yes	Yes	Yes	?	?	?	?	
Simplenote	tags	Yes	No	Yes	?	No	No	No	No	Yes	Yes	?	Yes	Export to XML
TagSpaces	tags, files, directories	Yes	No	No	?	No	No	No	No	No	Yes	?	Yes	PNG, JPG, GIF, BMP, ICO, WEBP, SVG, PDF, HTML, MHT, MHTML, MARKDOWN, TXT, XML, JSON, OGG, OGV, WEBM, ODT, ODS, ODP, ODG, EPUB, ZIP
TiddlyWiki	tags (wikiwords)	Yes	Yes	Yes	?	Via plugin	No	?	No	Yes(via browser)	Yes	?	Yes	HTML, json, txt, csv
Tomboy	?	Yes	?	Yes	?	No	No	No	No	Yes	Yes	?	Yes	NoteXmlFormat, HTML, PDF, wiki-formats
Ulysses	Notebooks, sections, tags	Yes	Yes	Yes	?	Yes	Yes	Yes	?	Yes	Yes	Yes	Yes	Rich text; export as HTML; import text files; markdown editing.
Microsoft Windows Journal	?	?	No	?	?	No	?	Yes	Yes (Note: Handwritten notes are searchable.)	?	?	?	Yes	Proprietary
Zettlr	Tree, Tags, Wiki	Yes	?	Yes (Note: Sync of files and folders using external services.)	No	No	No	No	No	Yes (Note: Internal spell check or LanguageTool integration.)	Yes	Yes	Yes	Markdown, Export and Import of Pandoc supported formats.
Zim	tags (wikiwords)	Yes	No	No	?	No	No	No	No	Yes	Yes	Yes	Yes, using installed web browser	Stored in modified DokuWiki Markdown; export: HTML, LaTeX, Pandoc Markdown, Sphinx RST (reStructuredText)
Name	Organizing principle(s)	Outline bulleting with indent	Tabbed sections	Sync	Web Clipping	PDF annotate and save	Whiteboarding	Ink-pen input	Handwriting recognition	Spell check	Search	Replace	Printing	File save/export/import formats

== Advanced formatting and content ==
Name	Drawing atop text	Text box, flow diagram	Text and paragraph formatting	Insert hyperlink	Insert image	Resize image	Insert table	Insert audio	Insert video	Attachment	Other objects	Remarks / other features
AllMyNotes Organizer	No	No	Yes	Yes	Yes	Yes	Yes	No	No	Yes	Alarms, check-boxes, bullets, phones, advanced links, autosaving; last cursor position memory, passwords on tree folders, failure-resistant self-healing DB engine	
Bear	No	No	Yes	Yes	Yes	Yes	Yes	No	No	No	check-boxes, bullets, link to notes, encryption, document scanning, OCR search	
CintaNotes	No	No	Yes	Yes	No	?	No	No	No	Yes	Links to notes	Tagging and searching for tags, tag hierarchy
ConnectedText	No	Yes	Yes	Yes	Yes	?	Yes	No	Yes	Yes	Scripting of pages with Python and other scripting languages.	LaTeX, Scripts, RSS Feeds, Transclusion, Directed Graphs and Flowcharts by GraphViz, many other features.
Day One	No	No	Yes	Yes	Yes	?	Yes	No	Yes	No	tags, bullets, numbering, line, programming code snippets	editable note metadata (date/time, location, weather, motion activity, music playing, step count)
Evernote	No	No	Yes	Yes	Yes	Yes (Note: At least Microsoft Windows version (06/2016))	Yes	Yes	Yes	Yes	Check-box, line, tags	Business and personal notes integrated in same client; businesses have control over business notes, but cannot see personal notes
Gnote	No	No	Yes	Yes	No	No	No	No	No	No	?	Port of Tomboy to C++; wiki-style linked notes
Google Keep	No	No	Yes	Yes	Yes	?	Partial (Note: Lists only, with check-box facility.)	Yes	?	No	Google Calendar reminders	Notes can be shared with other Google Keep users.
IPython Notebook	?	?	?	?	?	?	?	?	?	?	?	Part of IPython shell; allows for programming code, output and annotation to be combined in single interactive environment
Joplin	?	Yes	Yes	Yes	Yes	Partial (Note: Resize large images)	Yes	Yes	Yes	Yes	Links to other notes	Configurable editor layout with live preview of Markdown; Command pallette; Notes <--> Todo conversion; Plug-ins; Cloud sync available with various services, including a separate server self-hosted server; Configurable note history; Optional client side encryption; Custom CSS (imported from local or remote source) for rendered Markdown as well as app interface;
KeyNote NF	No	No	Yes	Yes	Yes (Note: As the RTF format stores pictures internally as bitmaps (.bmp), this leads to large notebook files.)	Yes	Yes (Note: Tables must be created in another program. After pasting the table into Keynote NF, one can edit the cells and add new rows, but changing the size of the columns and adding or removing columns is not possible. These operations can be done by pasting the table into another program (for example, MS Word).)	No	No	Yes	OLE objects; "virtual nodes" which integrate and edit the content of external plain-text or rich-text files; internal links; mirror nodes.	Text processing; tree numbering and sorting; custom tree icons; node checkboxes; checkbox filtering; search filtering; reminder alarms; compressed or encrypted notebooks; auto-minimize and/or auto-lock when idle; quick access key for fast notes; additional scratchpad; autosave of up to 9 previous file versions; automatic clipboard capturing; read-only notebooks or notes; macros; templates; text shortcuts; plug-ins; bookmarks; custom keyboard shortcuts; program can be made portable through "Options" setting
Logseq	No	No	Yes	Yes	Yes	Yes	Yes	Yes	Yes	Yes	Schedule/Deadline, TODO, LaTeX, arbitrary extensions	
Memonic	?	?	?	?	?	?	?	?	?	?	?	
Microsoft OneNote	Yes	Yes	Yes	Yes	Yes	Yes	Yes	Yes (Note: Can also search in audio.)	Yes	Yes	OLE, bullets, line, flags, formulas	No local storage of notebooks on Mac or versions past Office 2016
MyInfo	?	?	Yes	Yes	Yes	Yes	Yes	Yes	No	Yes	OLE, bullets, numbering, page breaks, advanced links	Tags; filters; calendar; reminders
MyNotex	?	?	Yes	Yes	Yes	?	?	?	?	Yes	?	Activity lists; tags; notes management by subject; encryption with AES or GPG; multilingual
Notational Velocity	?	?	?	?	?	?	?	?	?	?	?	Instant open and searching
Notion	No	No	Yes	Yes	Yes	Yes	Yes	Yes	Yes	Yes	Bullets, numbering, checkboxes, reminders, calendars	
Obsidian	No	Yes	Yes	Yes	Yes	Partial	Yes	Yes	Yes	Yes	Bullets, numbering, checkboxes, canvases, HTML, LaTeX, internal links	
Okular	?	?	?	?	?	?	?	?	?	?	?	
Open-Sankoré	Yes	Yes	Yes	Yes	Yes	?	Yes	Yes	Yes	Yes	plug-ins, web pages, applications	Annotate live desktop applications and web pages; autosave; plug-in system; audio recording
Org-mode (Emacs)	Yes	Yes	Yes	Yes	Yes	Yes	Yes	No	No	Yes	Advanced linking, bullets, tags, checkboxes, full spreadsheet, embedding of programming code, formulas, markup	Major mode of Emacs; uses plain-text; includes ToDos, spreadsheet, deadlines, encryption, reminders, agenda, calendar
PDF Studio	?	?	?	?	?	?	?	?	?	?	?	
Personal Knowbase	?	?	?	Yes	?	?	?	?	?	Yes	?	Passwords; portable
Qiqqa	Yes	Yes	No	Yes	Yes	?	No	No	No	No	PDF, brainstorm, citations	
Samsung Notes	Yes	Yes	?	Yes	Yes	?	No	Yes	?	?	PDF	
Simplenote	No	No	Yes	Yes	No	?	No	No	No	No		
TagSpaces	No	No	Yes	Yes	Yes	Yes	Yes	Yes	Yes	?	Tags, plugins	Plugins, you can present your local images, videos and music to your TV via ChromeCast. You can create a personal "wiki" for tracking of your projects, ideas or memories.
TiddlyWiki	?	Yes(with plugin)	Yes	Yes	Yes	Yes	Yes	Yes	Yes	Yes	HTML, LaTeX, markdown plugins	Plugins; user scripts
Tomboy	Partial	No	Partial	Yes	No	No	No	No	No	No	Note Links, highlighting, fixed-width	Reminders; to do-lists; formulas in LaTeX
Microsoft Windows Journal	?	?	?	?	?	?	?	?	?	?	?	
Zettlr	No	No	Yes	Yes	Yes	Partial (Note: Resize upon initial insertion.)	Yes	No	No	No	Bullets, numbering, checkboxes, HTML, LaTeX, internal links, citations	
Zim	No	Yes (Note: Using plugins)	Yes	Yes	Yes	Yes	Yes	No	No	Yes	Plugins; Versioning; LaTeX integration (formulas, export); HTML export (including slideshow); GNOME's Zeitgeist integration; Lilypond music sheet integration	ASCII diagram drawing; Tags; Tasks; Table of Content navigation; SQLite3 search indexing; Autosaving; Last cursor position memory; Tabbed multi-documents
Name	Drawing atop text	Text box, flow diagram	Text and paragraph formatting	Insert hyperlink	Insert image	Resize image	Insert table	Insert audio	Insert video	Attachment	Other objects	Remarks / other features

== See also ==
- Comparison of text editors
- Comparison of web annotation systems
- Comparison of wiki software
- Comparison of word processor programs
- List of personal information managers
- List of text editors
- List of wiki software
- Outliner
- Personal information manager
- Personal knowledge base
- Personal wiki
