= MyNotex =

Notetaking and activity management software

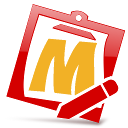

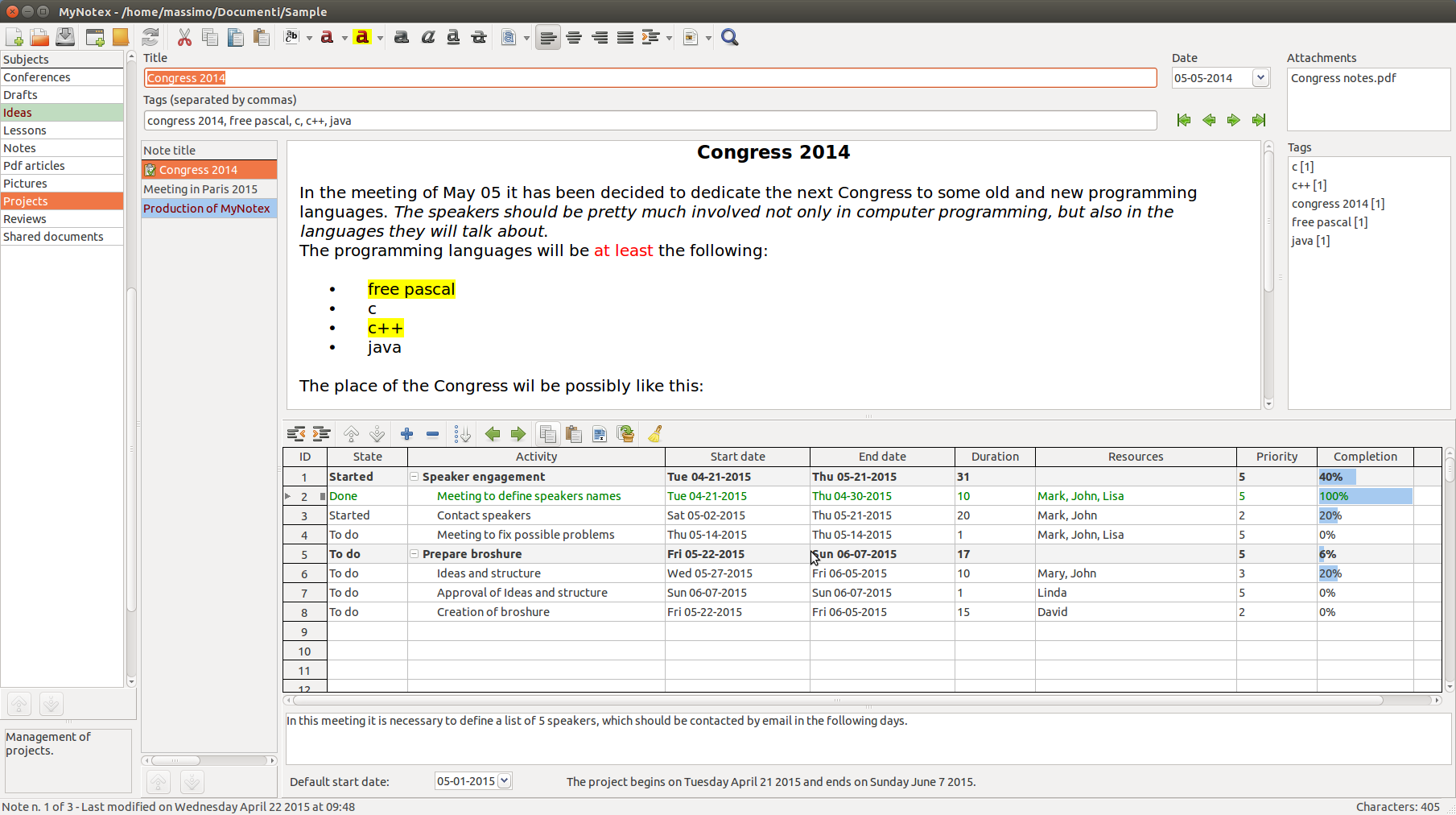
- Screenshot of MyNotex 1.4
- Developer: Massimo Nardello
- Stable release: 1.4.1 / August 14, 2017; 8 years ago
- Written in: Object Pascal
- Operating system: Linux
- Available in: English, French, German, Italian, Portuguese, Russian
- Type: Notetaking application, activity management, document management
- License: GPL-3.0-or-later
- Website: sites.google.com/site/mynotex/
- Repository: none

MyNotex is free software dedicated to notetaking and activity management. It offers several features for redaction, classification and search according to certain criteria. Its interface resembles a text editor and has several panes that give an overview of how content is organized.

== How it works ==
The basic unit of content is a note, and has several characteristics: title, date, keywords (tags), list of activities, attachments (compressed in a ZIP archive) and text that can be formatted and encrypted, and may contain hashtags.

Notes are grouped in subjects. A side pane lets you select a subject to view all notes that are part of it, sorted by date, title or by a custom order. Once displayed, a note can be directly edited.

Each note has a spreadsheet-like grid to manage a list of activities which is quite similar to the one used in many software of project management. The various activities of one or all the notes of a file of MyNotex may be shown in a diary view and possibly exported in iCal format. This makes MyNotex useful not only for personal use, but also within a team to organize the activities of all its members.

Finally, a bottom pane can be used to search notes, also within the previous result set, by subjects, title, content, attachment names, date or keywords.

== Features ==
MyNotex offers various text formatting options (bold, italic, underline, strikethrough, color, highlighting, font size and name, paragraph alignment and indentation), image insertion, three title levels as well as automatic recognition of lists (ordered or not) and links (to local files, web addresses, e-mails or another note). Several keyboard shortcuts are set to assist in writing and formatting (like insertion of the current date and time in a new line, move paragraphs up and down or restoration of default font). It's also possible to set globally the space among the paragraphs or within the lines of each paragraph of the text of the notes.

Content can be written directly in the software or imported from various sources:

- plain text;
- OpenOffice.org or LibreOffice text documents;
- notes created with Tomboy or Gnote (if a note was already imported, only changes will be imported again);
- other files of MyNotex.

In any case, the text of a note can be encrypted with AES. MyNotex also allows the user to encrypt and decrypt files with GPG.

As for exporting notes, it supports HTML and MyNotex' native format. Also, a note can be copied as LaTeX or opened with OpenOffice.org Writer, LibreOffice Writer or the default web browser, which allows among others to print its content. Anyway, it can be printed also within the program itself. Finally, it's possible to send the text of a note by email.

Various organizing features allow to move a note from one subject to another, add comments to each subject, remove content, etc. In addition to search facilities and interface browsing via panes, it's possible to access notes through bookmarks. There is also an alarm clock useful to be alerted at a specified time.

== Synchronization ==
Two files of MyNotex can be kept synchronized. Thus, changes made to one file will result in changes to the other during the process of synchronization. All types of changes are tracked (new, changed and deleted subjects, notes and attachments).

Files can therefore be modified offline and then be updated via a local network or the Internet (for instance through a cloud service).

MyNotex can be set to perform automatic synchronization when a file is opened or closed.

== Technical design ==
MyNotex is written in Object Pascal and is developed using Lazarus. It runs on Linux and is compiled for GNOME.

MyNotex stores notes in a SQLite database, but attachments (any type of file format) are compressed and saved in a folder in the same location as the database.

== See also ==
- Comparison of notetaking software
- Notetaking
