= Zettlr =

Open-source note-taking application

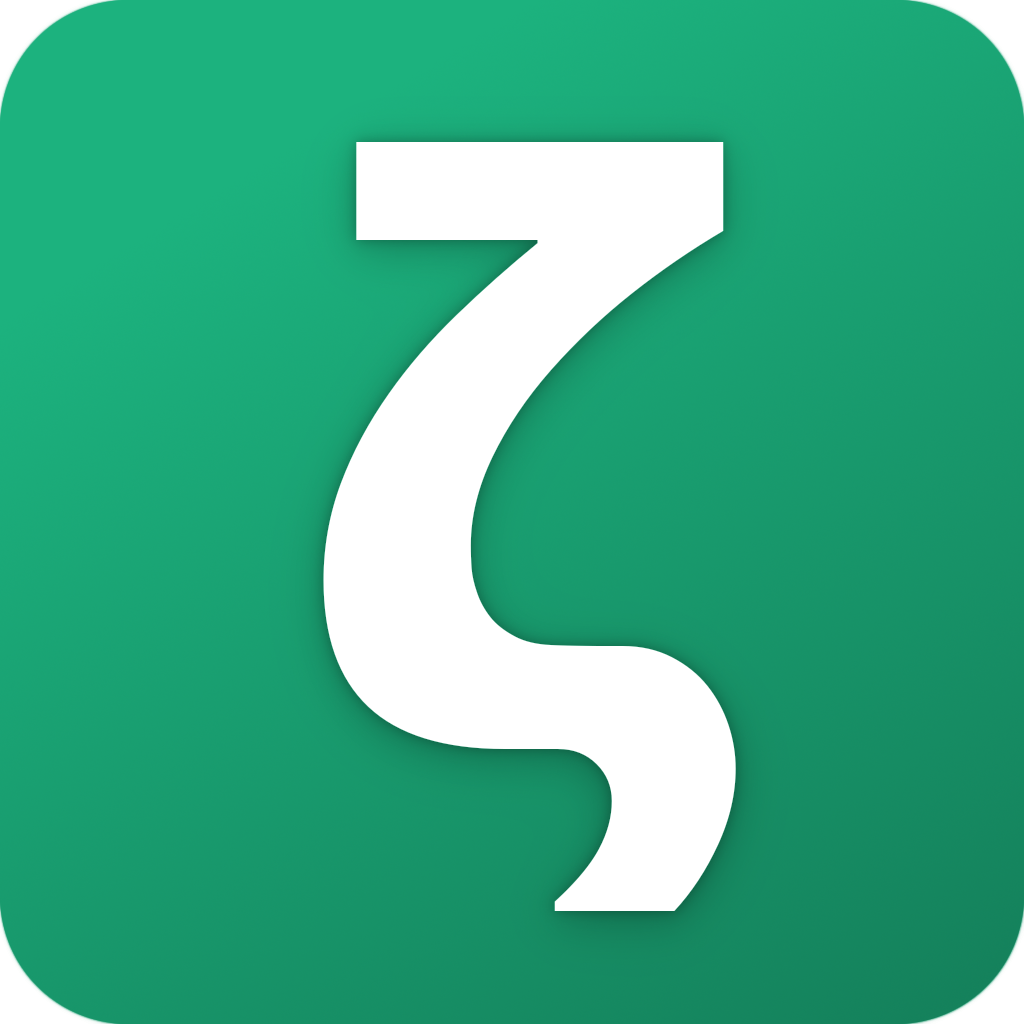
- Developer: Hendrik Erz
- Release: December 26, 2017; 8 years ago
- Stable release: 4.8.0 / September 18, 2026; 5 days ago
- Written in: Electron, TypeScript, JavaScript, HTML, CSS
- Operating system: Windows, macOS, Linux
- Type: note-taking; personal knowledge base; personal information manager
- License: GNU General Public License
- Website: zettlr.com
- Repository: github.com/Zettlr/Zettlr

Zettlr is a free and open-source note-taking application that works with Markdown files. Files may be exported and imported from a variety of different formats using an integration with Pandoc, whilst integration with reference managers allows for insertion of citations into documents. Internal links may be created between notes, which can be visualised as a graph, enabling its use as a personal information management system or digital Zettelkasten. The name Zettlr is derived from the German word Zettel meaning 'note'.

== History ==
Development on Zettlr began in November 2017, after the developer, Hendrik Erz, felt he had "tried several Markdown editors... and realize[d] that there [were] simply none written for the needs of organizing a huge amount of text efficiently", and that existing options were mostly "tailored to the needs of engineers and mathematicians", leading him to start developing an application that he wanted to personally use. Version 1.0 was released in December 2018 and version 2.0 was released in October 2021. Version 3.0 was released in September 2023, introducing a new logo as well as split view, multiple windows, pinned tabs, a status bar, and LanguageTool integration for spelling and grammar checking. Version 4.0 was released in December 2025, to coincide with Zettlr's eighth anniversary, and featured a new table editor, a PDF and image viewer, and a new citations parser.

== Features ==
Zettlr is built on Electron, as a cross-platform application that runs on Windows, Linux, and macOS. The software features 5 main built-in themes, but can be further customised using custom CSS.

Zettlr operates with folders of text documents to enable organisation of notes, with top-level folders able to be opened as Workspaces within the application. Workspaces may include a mixture of files and directories, and files can be exported to over 30 different formats such as HTML, PDF, ODT, DOCX, and LaTeX, among others, using Pandoc. Files may either be exported individually, or as part of a project, which enables multiple files to be combined into one output document. Zettlr integrates with reference managers such as Zotero, JabRef and Mendeley using CSL JSON or BibTeX files to enable inclusion of citations and bibliographies for academic writing. Zettlr also allows for internal linking between notes, creating an interactive graph that visualises the relationships between notes, as well as the use of tags to enable further file organisation.

The software follows the idea of explicit separation of content and form.

== See also ==
- Comparison of note-taking software – Comparison of computer software designed for taking notes
