= Notesnook =

Note-taking software

- Developer: Streetwriters (Private) Limited.
- Release: 2021; 5 years ago
- Operating system: Microsoft Windows; macOS; Android; iOS; Web
- Available in: English, French, German, Spanish, Dutch,
- Type: Note-taking, Wiki (Knowledge management software, Collaborative software)
- License: Freemium

Notesnook is a crossplatform open-source note-taking application developed by Streetwriters (Private) Limited. Notesnook uses a zero-knowledge end-to-end encryption system to keep user data safe from start to finish.The system runs the password through Argon2 using a, per-user salt derived from a fixed client salt combined with email. The server receives the data needed to authenticate and sync the account while the notes remain encrypted on the device.

== See also ==
- Collaborative real-time editor
- Document collaboration
- Comparison of note-taking software
