= Zettelkasten =

Knowledge management and note-taking method

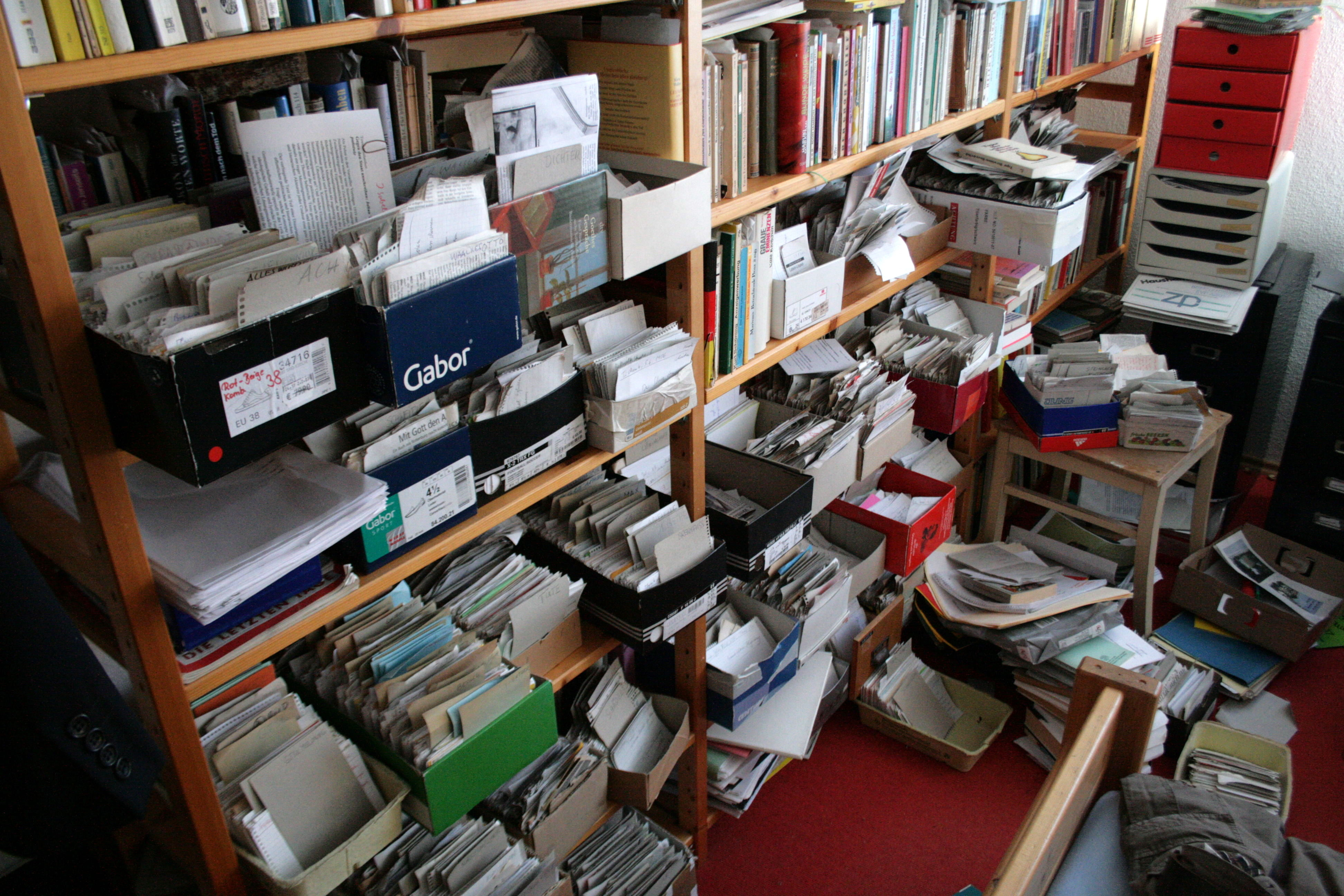
A German scholar's physical Zettelkasten or card file

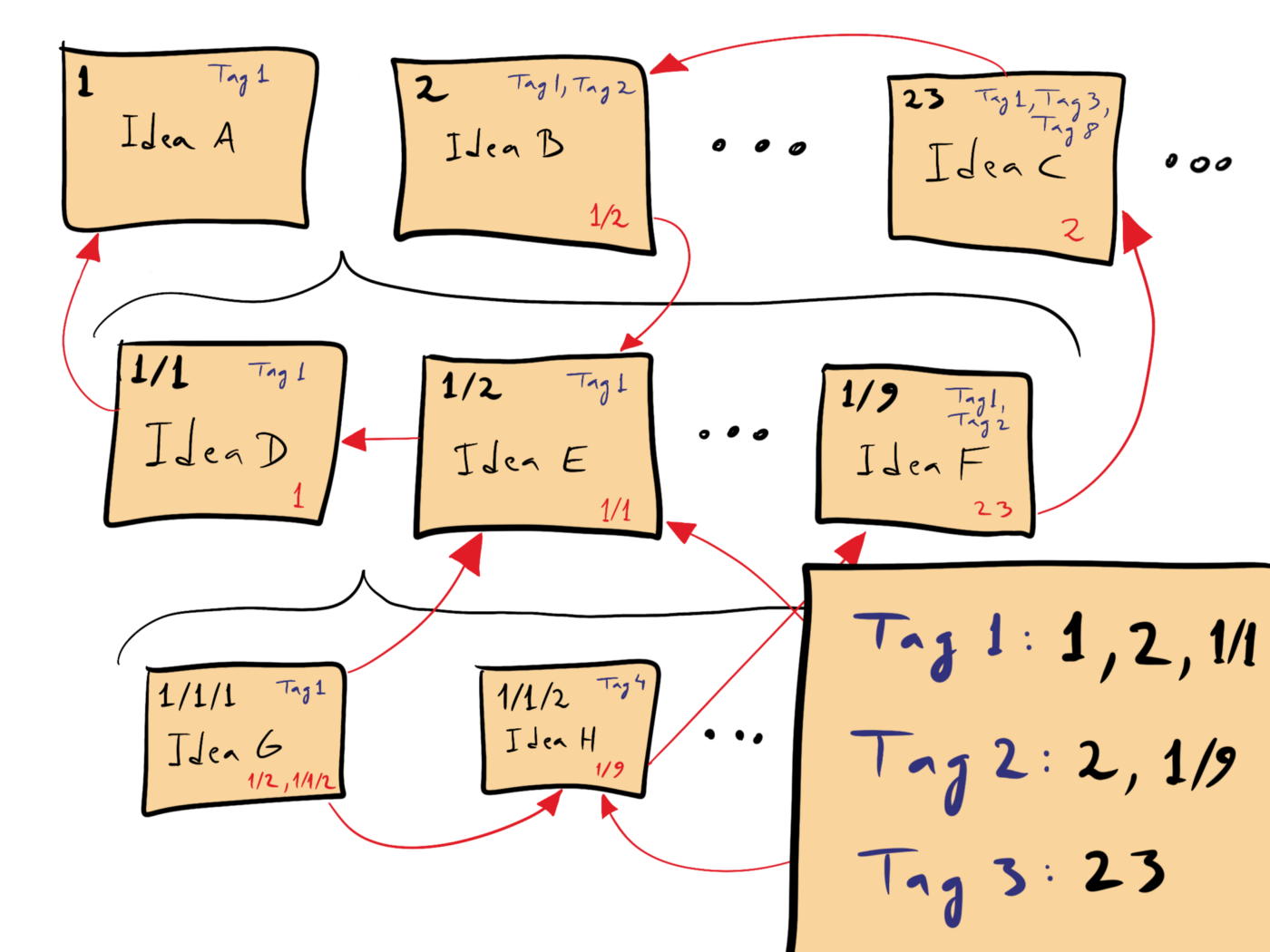
A card file for personal knowledge management can be made up of notes containing numbers, tags (blue) and cross-references to other notes (red). A tag index (bottom right) allows topical cross-referencing.

A Zettelkasten (German: 'slipbox', plural Zettelkästen) or card file consists of small items of information stored on Zetteln (German: 'slips'; singular: Zettel), paper slips or cards, that may be linked to each other through subject headings or other metadata such as numbers and tags. It has often been used as a system of note-taking and personal knowledge management for research, study, and writing.

In the 1980s, the card file began to be used as metaphor in the interface of some hypertextual personal knowledge base software applications such as NoteCards. In the 1990s, such software inspired the invention of wikis.

== Use in personal knowledge management ==
As used in research, study, and writing, a card file consists of many individual notes with ideas and other short pieces of information that are taken down as they occur or are acquired. The notes may be numbered hierarchically so that new notes may be inserted at the appropriate place, and contain metadata to allow the note-taker to associate notes with each other. For example, notes may contain subject headings or tags that describe key aspects of the note, and they may reference other notes. The numbering, metadata, format, and structure of the notes are subject to variation depending on the specific method employed.

The system not only allows a researcher to store and retrieve information related to their research, but has also long been used to enhance creativity.

== History ==
The paper slip or card has long been used by individual researchers and by organizations to manage information, including the specialized form of the card catalog.

Coming from a commonplace book tradition, Conrad Gessner (1516–1565) invented his own method of organization in which the individual notes could be rearranged at any time. In retrospect, his recommendation of gluing slips onto bound sheets was an innovation in moving from commonplace books to index cards as a form for scholarly information management.

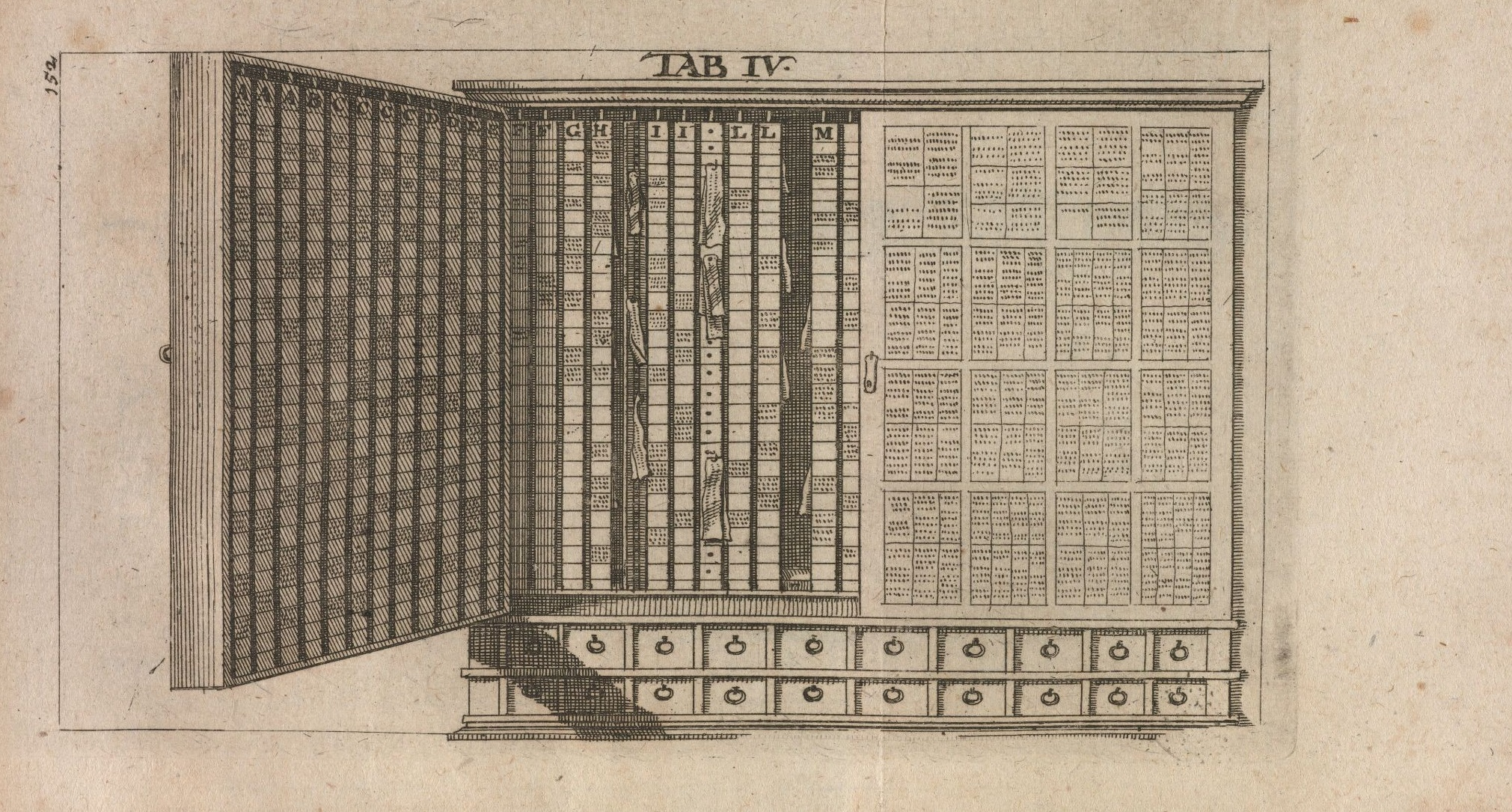
Filing cabinet for paper slips in Vincent Placcius's De arte excerpendi (1689)

The first early modern card cabinet was designed by 17th-century English inventor Thomas Harrison (c. 1640s). Harrison's manuscript on the "ark of studies" (Arca studiorum) describes a small cabinet that allows users to excerpt books and file their notes in a specific order by attaching pieces of paper to metal hooks labeled by subject headings. Harrison's system was edited and improved by Vincent Placcius in his well-known handbook on excerpting methods (De arte excerpendi, 1689). The German polymath Gottfried Wilhelm Leibniz (1646–1716) was known to have relied on Harrison's invention in at least one of his research projects.

In 1767, Carl Linnaeus used "little paper slips of a standard size" to record information for his research. Over 1,000 of Linnaeus's precursors to the modern index card containing information collected from books and other publications and measuring five by three inches are housed at the Linnean Society of London.

Later in his own commonplace, under the heading "My way of collecting materials for future writings" (translated), Johann Jacob Moser (1701–1785) described the algorithms with which he filled his card boxes.

The 1796 idyll Leben des Quintus Fixlein by German Romantic writer Jean Paul is structured according to the Zettelkasten in which the protagonist keeps his autobiography. Paul ultimately assembled 12,000 paper scraps into his commonplace books over the course of his lifetime.

French scholars Charles-Victor Langlois and Charles Seignobos, in their Introduction to the Study of History (1897), recommended that historians take notes on paper slips or cards, and they commented: "Every one admits nowadays that it is advisable to collect materials on separate cards or slips of paper." However, decades later, other scholars wrote that in 1890s America, the card-file note-taking system was "still something of a novelty".

=== 20th century ===
Antonin Sertillanges' book The Intellectual Life (1921) outlines in Chapter 7 a version of the card-file method. The book was published in French, and translated into English, in many editions over the span of 60 years. In it, Sertillanges recommends taking notes on slips of "strong paper of a uniform size" either self made with a paper cutter or by "special firms that will spare you the trouble, providing slips of every size and color as well as the necessary boxes and accessories". He also recommends a "certain number of tagged slips, guide-cards, so as to number each category visibly after having numbered each slip, in the corner or in the middle". He goes on to suggest creating a catalog or index of subjects with divisions and subdivisions and recommends the "very ingenious system", the decimal system, for organizing one's research. For the details of this he refers the reader to Organization of Intellectual Work: Practical Recipes for Use by Students of All Faculties and Workers (1918) by Paul Chavigny. Sertillanges recommends against the previous patterns seen with commonplace books where one does note taking in books or on slips of paper which might be pasted into books as they don't "easily allow classification" or "readily lend themselves to use at the moment of writing".

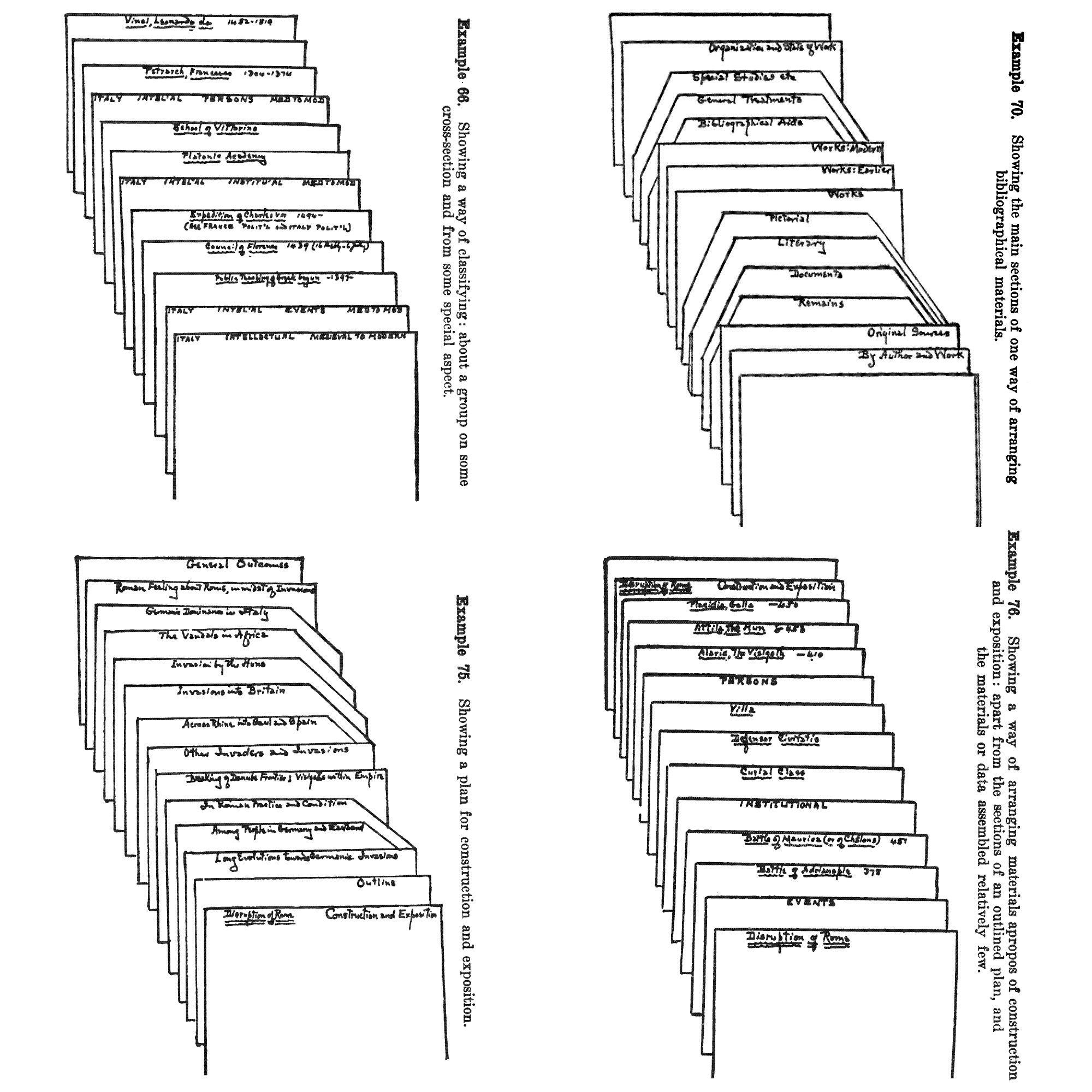
Examples of ways of arranging a card-file note-system, from Earle W. Dow's Principles of a Note-system for Historical Studies (1924)

Example of a numbering hierarchy for organizing notes in a card file, recommended in Carter Alexander's How to Locate Educational Information and Data (1935)

Some examples of English-language research manuals with instructions for a card-file note-taking system are: Earle W. Dow's Principles of a Note-system for Historical Studies (1924), Homer C. Hockett's Introduction to Research in American History (1931), Sidney and Beatrice Webb's Methods of Social Study (1932), Carter Alexander's How to Locate Educational Information and Data (four editions from 1935 to 1958), Cecil B. Williams's A Research Manual (three editions from 1940 to 1963), Louis R. Gottschalk's Understanding History (1951), Chauncey Sanders's An Introduction to Research in English Literary History (1952), Jacques Barzun and Henry F. Graff's The Modern Researcher (six editions from 1957 to 2004), and A Guide to Historical Method (three editions from 1969 to 1980) by Robert Jones Shafer and colleagues. A German-language manual on research methods that included instructions for a Zettelkasten was Technique of Scholarly Work (multiple editions from the 1930s to 1970) by Johannes Erich Heyde.

American historian Frederic L. Paxson (1877–1948) filed notes on 3×5-inch paper slips daily throughout his career, and by the time of his death all the slips filled about 80 wooden file drawers. The notes were ordered chronologically and topically, with cross-references on each card to related subject headings, linking each subject through various stages in time.

German philosopher and cultural critic Walter Benjamin (1892–1940) used a card-file note-taking system with a numbering system to create his Arcades Project written between 1927 and 1940. Though the project was terminated by Benjamin's death, it was later edited and published in a final form.

French theorist, philosopher, and writer Roland Barthes (1915–1980) kept a fichier boîte or index card file beginning in 1943 until his death. Curator Nathalie Léger has indicated that there are 12,250 slips in Roland Barthes's bequest at the Institut Mémoires de l'édition contemporaine (IMEC). Louis-Jean Calvet explains that in writing Michelet, Barthes used his notes on index cards to try out various combinations of cards to both organize them as well as "to find correspondences between them". In addition to using his card file for producing his published works, Barthes also used his note taking system for teaching. His final course on the topic of The Neutral, which he taught as a seminar at Collège de France, was contained in four bundles consisting of 800 cards which contained everything from notes, summaries, figures, and bibliographic entries. In his autobiographical Roland Barthes, Barthes reproduces three of his index cards in facsimile. Published posthumously in 2010, Barthes's Mourning Diary was created from a collection of 330 of his index cards focusing on his mourning following the death of his mother. The book jacket of the book prominently features one of his index cards from the collection. In a well known photo of Barthes in his office taken by Henri Cartier-Bresson in 1963, the author is pictured with his card files on the shelf behind him.

Starting in the 1940s, German philosopher and intellectual historian Hans Blumenberg (1920–1996) compiled more than 30,000 cards into his Zettelkasten, which now occupy 32 conservation boxes at the German Literature Archive in Marbach. Blumenberg was inspired by the previous notetaking work and output of Georg Christoph Lichtenberg who used waste books or sudelbücher as he called them.

In the creation of the Great Books of the Western World (1952), which also includes A Syntopicon, Mortimer J. Adler and many collaborators created a large shared collection of tagged and indexed cards to collate the ideas and information for their series.

Argentine-Canadian philosopher and physicist Mario Bunge (1919–2020), who published about 70 books and 540 articles, used index cards in boxes to teach and to write publications starting in the mid-1950s.

One researcher famous for his extensive use of the method was the German sociologist Niklas Luhmann (1927–1998). Starting in 1952–1953, Luhmann built up a Zettelkasten of some 90,000 index cards for his research, and credited it for enabling his extraordinarily prolific writing (including about 50 books and 550 articles). He linked the cards together by assigning each a unique index number based on a branching hierarchy. These index cards were digitized and made available online in 2019. Luhmann described the Zettelkasten as part of his research into systems theory in the essay "Kommunikation mit Zettelkästen".

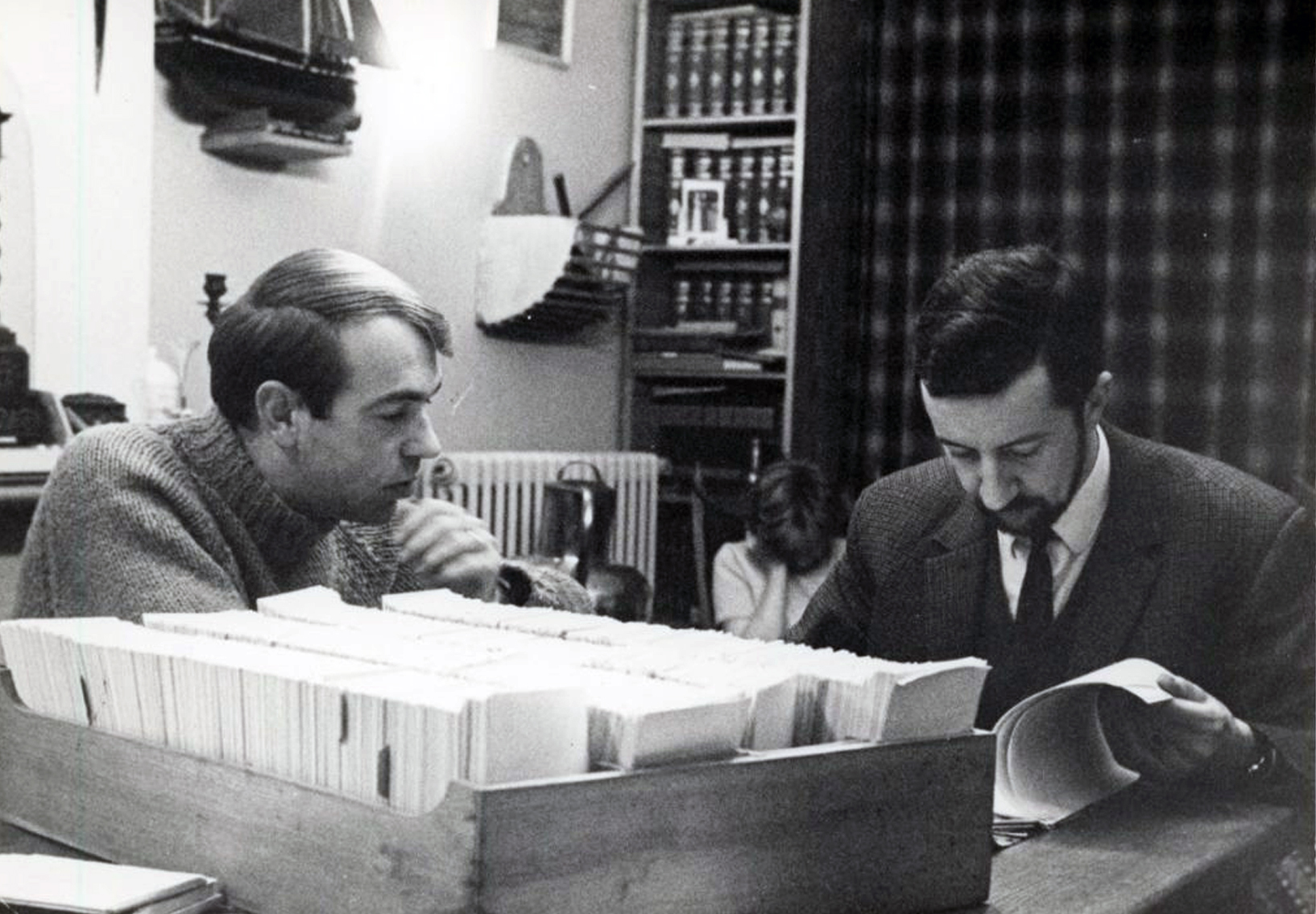
Writer and lexicographer Roland Desnerck with a lexical card file in the 1960s

Other well known German Zettelkasten users include Arno Schmidt (who used a large card file to write Zettels Traum, published in 1970), Walter Kempowski, Friedrich Kittler, and Aby Warburg, whose works along with those of Paul, Blumenberg, and Luhmann appeared in the 2013 exhibition "Zettelkästen. Machines of Fantasy" at the Museum of Modern Literature, Marbach am Neckar.

Australian writer Kate Grenville, in a chapter of The Writing Book (1990) devoted to using "piles" of notes as part of the writing process, said that screenwriters are known to use index cards to help organise their scripts, and American writer Anne Lamott devoted a chapter to a writer's use of index cards in her book Bird by Bird (1994).

German writer Michael Ende kept a Zettelkasten, and in 1994, a year prior to his death, he published Michael Endes Zettelkasten: Skizzen und Notizen (translation: Michael Ende's File-card Box: Drafts and Notes), an anthology of some of his writing as well as observations and aphorisms from his card file.

Twentieth-century American comedians Phyllis Diller (with 52,000 3×5-inch index cards), Joan Rivers (over a million 3×5-inch index cards), Bob Hope (85,000 pages in files), Milton Berle and George Carlin (paper notes in folders) were known for keeping joke or gag files throughout their careers. They often compiled their notes from scraps of paper, receipts, laundry lists, and matchbooks which served the function of waste books. U.S. president Ronald Reagan kept quotes and aphorisms which he frequently used for speeches in a card collection.

== Literary references ==
- Jean Paul's idyll The Life of Quintus Fixlein (1796) has the subtitle as Drawn from Fifteen Boxes of Paper Slips.
- In the preface to the novel Penguin Island (1908) by Nobel laureate Anatole France, a scholar is drowned by an avalanche of multicolored index cards which formed a gigantic whirlpool streaming out of his overflowing card boxes.
- In chapter two of Robert M. Pirsig's philosophical novel Lila: An Inquiry into Morals (1991), the main character describes an index card system of notes he's keeping for a book. While the German word Zettelkasten isn't used, the descriptor "slips" is used repeatedly (as opposed to index card which appears four times) and the system has the general form and function of a card file as commonly used by writers.
- In Paper Machines (2002), Markus Krajewski's history of card catalogs (Zettelkataloge) and card files (Zettelkästen), as both thinking devices and precursors of today's computers, Krajewski draws connections to literary authors like Jonathan Swift, Georg Christoph Lichtenberg, Gotthold Ephraim Lessing, Heinrich Heine, Goethe, Jean Paul, Vladimir Nabokov, Arno Schmidt, and Nicholson Baker.

== See also ==
- Argument map – Visual representation of the structure of an argument
- Bullet journal – Method for note taking
- Comparison of note-taking software – Comparison of computer software designed for taking notes
- Edge-notched card – Index card with notches to store data
- ENQUIRE – Tim Berners-Lee's program, predecessor to the World Wide Web, that used a card file metaphor
- Hipster PDA – Pen and paper personal organizer
- Issue-based information system – Argumentation scheme
- Kanban – Japanese business method
- Memex – Hypothetical proto-hypertext system
- Outliner – Type of software to organize texts
- Personal information management – Tools and systems for managing one's own data
  - List of personal information managers
- Personal wiki
  - List of wiki software § Personal wiki software
- Reference management software – Software to use for recording and utilising bibliographic citations (references)
- Tag (metadata) § Knowledge tags
