= Keynote (notetaking software) =

Notetaking and outlining text editor for Windows

KeyNote
- Developers: Marek Jedliński, Tranglos Software
- Stable release: 2.1.7 .01 / 21 March 2026; 3 months ago
- Operating system: Windows
- Type: outliner
- License: Keynote: MPL-1.1; Keynote NF: MPL-2.0
- Website: www.tranglos.com
- Repository: github.com/dpradov/keynote-nf

KeyNote is a free notetaking and outlining text editor for Microsoft Windows, produced by Tranglos Software.

== Overview ==
Keynote is based on the tree data structure concept, allowing "nodes" in a tree panel (much like the tree panel in Windows file managers) to represent separate fields within a single text file. Individual documents within the tree can be edited in Rich Text Format (RTF) or simple text (unformatted).

Import and export of KeyNote files to and from TreePad files is fully supported. Each field is treated as a separate virtual document within the tree.

KeyNote is open-source software developed in Delphi 3. As of October 2005, development of the original program had ceased.

== See also ==
- Comparison of notetaking software
- Zim
