= AllMyNotes Organizer =

AllMyNotes Organizer is an outliner application for Windows. It allows storing all documents and notes in a single storage file. Documents are organized in a hierarchical tree representation for quick browsing by topic. A portable version which can be installed on a USB flashdrive, iPod, or removable hard disk drive which can be used on any PC without the need to be installed is also available.

== Features ==
- Organization – Notes can be organized with hierarchy boxes.
- Projecting – The user may assign check boxes and priorities to all items in the hierarchy.
- System tray menu – Allows the user to quickly capture clipboard content (documents and pictures), and to search data stored in the application.
- Global search – Searches in all notes. Advanced Google-like query language is supported.
- Password protection of data file and separate folders.
- Skins – Installation pack includes 16 skins.
- Alarm, Strong Password Generator and Spell Checker features.
- Icons – 56 icons available to assign to folders and notes. Icons are skin-dependent.
- Files and pictures can be attached to Notes in Rich Text Format edit control.
- Multilingual – Available in English, Spanish, French, Swedish, Italian, Korean, Polish, Dutch, Greek, Hungarian, Russian, Ukrainian, Bulgarian, Slovenian, Croatian, Czech, Turkish, Mainland Simplified Chinese, Taiwan Simplified Chinese, Traditional Chinese and Amharic.

== File formats ==
All data is stored locally in a single .ddb database file, encrypted at binary level using an 1800-bit encryption key. File access can be password restricted.

- Import- Notes can be imported from .rtf, .txt, .csv, .knt (KeyNote), and .enex (Evernote), and .html documents, and pictures can be imported from .jpg, .png, .gif, and .bmp files.
- Export- Notes can be exported to .rtf, .txt, and .html documents.

== Interface ==
The interface is functional and simple with a skinned, multilingual interface. The interface also contains a customizable toolbar. The work area is divided into two panels. The left-hand panel displays the hierarchy tree of documents, and the right-hand panel displays the contents of the currently selected item in the hierarchy. It has a rich-text edit control for notes and a folder preview with thumbnails of documents if a folder is selected.

== Versions, editions, and license ==
- Portable version is available for users who need to use AllMyNotes Organizer on multiple PCs, can be installed on USB stick or any other kind of removable media.
- Free and Deluxe editions available. Free edition is freeware. Deluxe edition has number of extended features compared to Free editions.

See also (external link): Comparison Table for Free and Deluxe Editions

== Milestones ==
- 30 January 2017 – Release of version 3
- 5 August 2010 – Release of version 2
- 30 November 2009 – Portable version is released. Version 1.15
- 20 November 2009 – Final Release of AllMyNotes Organizer. Version 1

== System requirements ==
- Windows 11, 10, 8, 7, Vista, XP. Works on Linux and Mac if Wine environment is installed.

== See also ==
- Comparison of notetaking software
- Lists of outliners for
  - desktops
  - mobile devices
  - web-based
