= Gnote =

Open-source desktop note-taking application

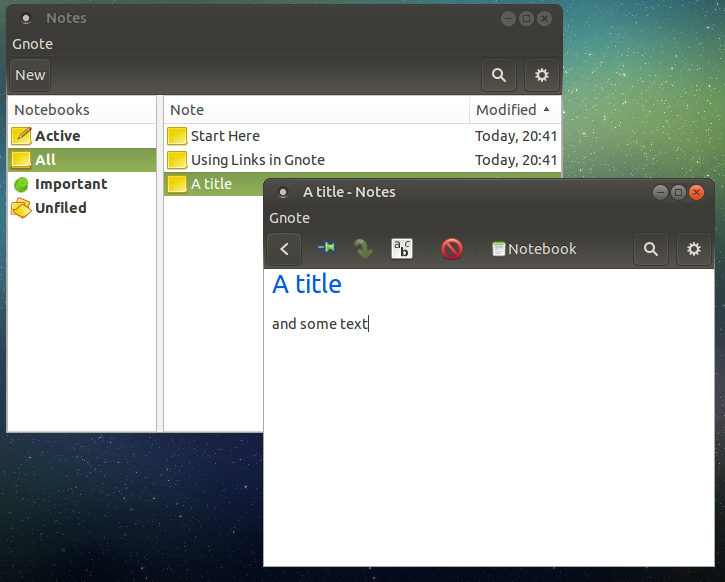
- Gnote 3.13 under Ubuntu MATE
- Developer: Aurimas Černius
- Stable release: 50.1 / 19 April 2026; 4 months ago
- Written in: C++
- Operating system: Linux
- Type: Notetaking application
- License: GPL-3.0-or-later
- Website: wiki.gnome.org/Apps/Gnote
- Repository: gitlab.gnome.org/GNOME/gnote.git

Gnote is a free and open-source desktop note-taking application written for Linux, cloned by Hubert Figuière from Tomboy. It uses a Wiki-like linking system to connect notes together. Gnote is part of the GNOME desktop environment, often filling the need for personal information management. The main principle is a notepad with a wiki-style interface. Words in the note body that match existing note titles automatically become hyperlinks, allowing for the management of large libraries of personal information, such as references to favorite artists that would then automatically be highlighted in notes containing their names. Plugins extend the program to include functionality like exporting to HTML and printing support. As of version 0.8.0, Gnote has been ported to GTK+3.

== History and uses ==
Gnote was created as a clone of Tomboy written in C++, to remove the dependency on Mono. Its release caused a minor controversy when the creator was accused of having an anti-Mono agenda. This prompted him to explain that Gnote was written as an exercise in porting Mono applications and that it provides a note-taking application for environments that are unable to fit the Mono framework. The program is included in Fedora, which dropped Mono from the Live CD installation disc, due to lack of space.

Some Linux-compatible hardware platforms are not officially supported by Mono, and thus cannot run Tomboy or other Mono software. On these platforms and any other, Gnote can be used as a drop-in replacement for Tomboy.

Since version 3.5, Gnote has used GNOME version numbering scheme.

== Features ==
Some of the editing features supported by Gnote include:

- Link to other notes
- Style text (bold, italic, strikeout, highlight)
- Change font size
- Create bulleted lists
- Undo and redo

== Plugins ==
Gnote supports plugins that add functionality:

- Print individual notes
- Sticky Notes importer
- Export single notes to HTML
- Bugzilla links
- Fixed width text
- Tomboy importer
- Backlinks, to see which notes link to the current note
- Underline text
- Insert timestamp
- Table of content

== See also ==
- Comparison of note-taking software
- Personal wiki
- Wiki software
