= TagSpaces =

Data manager and file navigator

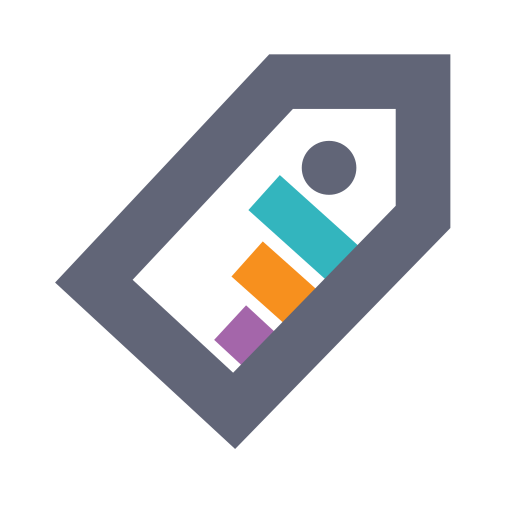

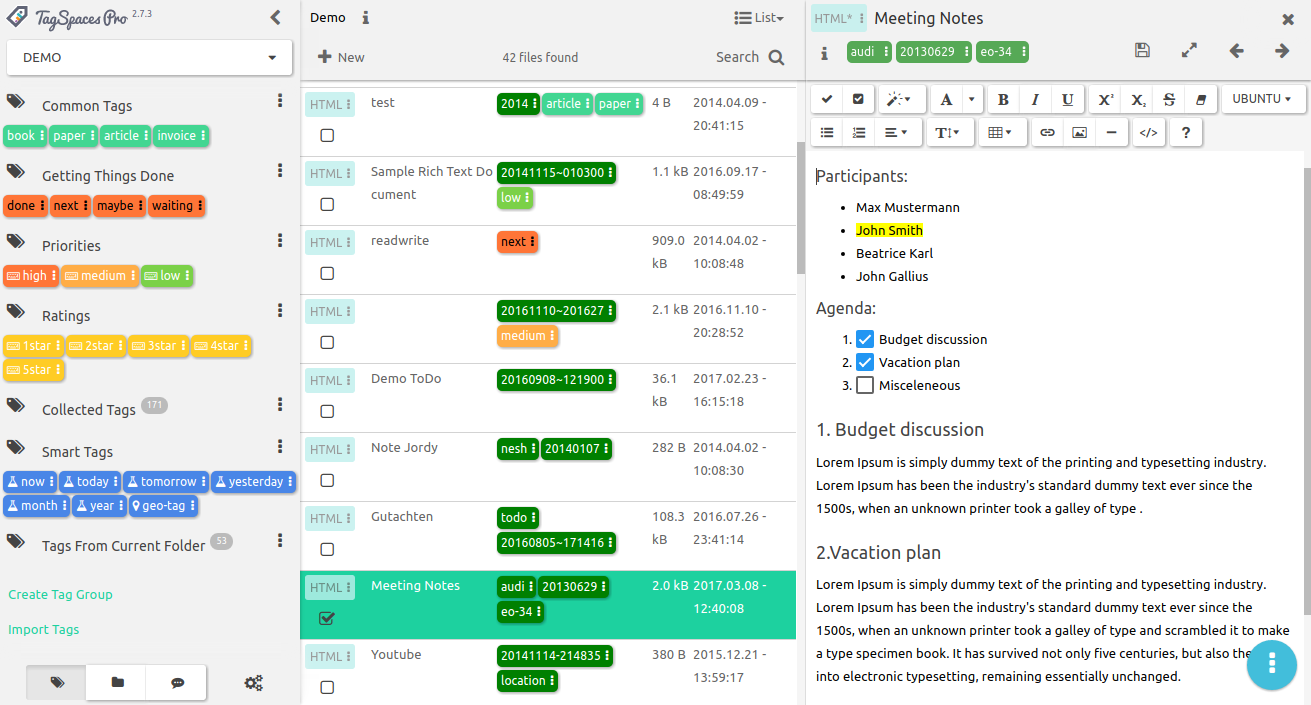
- Developer: TagSpaces
- Release: 23 December 2012; 13 years ago
- Stable release: 6.13.3 / 20 June 2026; 8 days ago
- Platform: Windows, Mac, Linux, Android
- Type: Productivity software
- License: AGPL-3.0-only
- Website: www.tagspaces.org
- Repository: github.com/tagspaces/tagspaces

TagSpaces is an open-source data manager and file navigator. It helps organize files on local drives by adding tags to files. Users get the same user interface to manage their files on different platforms. TagSpaces is compatible with Windows, Linux, Mac, Android, iPhone, Firefox and Chrome. The application requires neither internet connection nor user's registration to run both on desktop and portable devices.

== Overview ==
TagSpaces is an open source application for file navigation and data management. It helps users organize files, photos and other documents on their local drives. File management and data associations occur by labeling files with tags. Tags may vary in color and may also differ in purpose. Users create, name, edit, sort, group, rename and delete their own tags by following their own logic in the file-tagging process.

TagSpaces is compatible with most of the currently widespread platforms. Users access their information on different devices through a single user interface. It has a responsive design which adapts to window size and proportions of the device in use.

TagSpaces does not require Internet connection and access to cloud services in order to run on PC and portable devices. Users can sync their files between devices by using cloud storage services like Google Drive or Dropbox.

TagSpaces requires no registration. It is remotely similar to other file tagging and note-taking services (See "Similar products") on the basis of functionality, but it differs mainly because of its lack of database and its general offline / no-cloud / no vendor lock-in orientation.

== File names and file formats ==
Tags are added to the names of the tagged files. For example, by tagging a file called "img-9936.jpg" with the tags "lion" and "zoo" it will be renamed to "img-9936 [lion zoo].jpg".

TagSpaces allows users to create and edit text, markdown and rich text (HTML) files directly within the application.

Firefox and Chrome versions can save a currently open webpage into a local (mhtml) file containing text, pictures and formatting. This enables users to further view the webpage offline, to classify it with tags and to add it to their local file structure.

Supported file types for viewing and editing in TagSpaces are listed in the application's official Documentation Page, along with the corresponding platforms.

== Reviews ==
Alexandre Borque reviews TagSpaces on Medium.com as "The Independent User's No Cloud, Local File Navigator and Data Manager". He speculates it's an alternative to digital note organizers, such as Evernote and Onenote.

Technical writer Tatiana Kochedykova describes TagSpaces as a valuable instrument for educational purposes. She claims that "With TagSpaces, teachers can create and organize numerous notes, webpages, and e-books, tag, group, sort and prioritize files to quickly find the necessary one".

== Similar products ==
TagSpaces claims to have no alternative in the open source world, but it has some functional similarities with other note-taking, file managing and data organizing services, such as: Evernote, Onenote, Simplenote, Pocket and Picasa.

Considering the tagging files function, Tagspaces can be compared to Reference management software.

== See also ==
- Comparison of notetaking software
- List of personal information managers
