= Roam (software) =

Collaborative knowledge management platform

- Developer: Roam Research Inc.
- Release: 2019
- Stable release: 0.0.18
- Operating system: Microsoft Windows; macOS; Linux; Web
- Available in: English
- Type: Note-taking, Wiki (Knowledge management software, Collaborative software)
- License: Proprietary software, Commercial software
- Website: https://roamresearch.com

Roam is a California-based productivity and note-taking application developed by Roam Research Inc. The system is built on a directed graph, which frees it from the constraints of the classic filesystem tree. It is viewed as a competitor to Notion.

== See also ==
- Collaborative real-time editor
- Document collaboration
- Obsidian (software)
