= Whizfolders =

WhizFolders Organizer
- Developer(s): AvniTech Solutions
- Stable release: 7.1 / June 9, 2016; 8 years ago
- Operating system: Windows XP, Vista, 7, 8, 8.1, 10
- Type: Outliner, Notetaking software, Personal wiki
- Website: www.whizfolders.com

WhizFolders is an organizer and outliner for managing notes on Microsoft Windows. WhizFolders has been around since 1998 but is now discontinued. Its predecessor WhizNote, a plain text notes organizer, was released in CompuServe forums in 1993.

WhizFolders allows to manage your information in two-panes—the left pane being a hierarchical list of note titles and the right-pane contains the detail or text of the selected note in the list. The notes can be merged when copying to the clipboard, or when exporting or printing. A boolean search for information is available. Keyword tags can also be assigned to the notes to find them even when the actual tag is absent in their text.

A freeware viewer is separately available to read WhizFolder files.

== Features ==
- Hierarchical list of note titles
- Word wrapped note titles
- Drag and drop outlining of note titles
- Rich text note contents (RTF)
- Boolean or exact search
- Keyword tags
- Hyperlinks to other notes or external files, web sites
- Pasting from web sites with source address
- Automated pasting
- Merged export or printing of notes

== See also ==
- Comparison of notetaking software
- Notetaking
- Zim
