= Bear (app) =

Note-taking software

- Developer: Shiny Frog
- Release: 2016
- Stable release: 2.2.2
- Written in: C++, Objective-C, Swift
- Operating system: macOS, iOS, iPadOS
- Type: Note-taking application
- License: Freemium
- Website: bear.app

Bear is a note-taking application by Shiny Frog. Bear 2 launched for macOS, iOS and iPadOS in July 2023.

== History ==
After three years of development, the initial version of Bear was released in October 2016 for macOS, iOS and iPadOS. It was released as free application, with an optional paid subscription, that unlocks more advanced features, e.g. note syncing and app themes. In the same year, the application received Apple's Mac App of the Year Award.

In 2017, support for the Apple Watch was added and Shiny Frog received an Apple Design Award for their work on Bear.

Within one year of the initial release, the team started to work on version 2, while still releasing continuous updates for Bear 1. To implement all the features planned for Bear 2, the development team had to build a new text-editing system, code-named Panda. This new system is also needed for a future Bear web application. Version 2 was eventually released in July 2023 for macOS, iOS and iPadOS.

== Features ==
- notes are written in Markdown
- (nested) tags are used to organize the notes
- export to plain text, Markdown, TextBundle and RTF
- export to PDF, JPG, HTML, DOCX and ePub *
- search inside PDFs and images *
- synchronization with iCloud *
- GIF support
- support for sketches
- web clippers for Safari, Google Chrome and Firefox
- note encryption *
- support for Mermaid diagrams

* marks features that are only available to paying users

== See also ==
- Comparison of note-taking software
