= Memonic =

Web application

- Developer(s): Nektoon AG
- Final release: 1.0.0 / July 21, 2011; 14 years ago
- Operating system: Microsoft Windows; Mac OS X Android(via browser) iOS
- Type: Notetaking software
- License: Freemium
- Website: memonic.com

Memonic was a free web-based notetaking application that allowed users to save and organize information while conducting research online and offline. A clip may be a full webpage or webpage excerpt, a document or document excerpt, a text note, or a screenshot.

Memonic was based in Switzerland and was launched in November 2010. The company was co-founded by the current CEO Dorian Seiz.

== Product characteristics ==
Memonic offered a full online notetaking application for a number of platforms. Content may be clipped using a range of bookmarklets and extensions for various browsers or by using the desktop application. The online application worked on any standard browser.

Notes can also be added by email, or composed from scratch. Notes can be organized in folders, edited, commented and searched. A user can also create groups to share notes and collaborate with a closed user group.

Memonic operated on a freemium model with a free plan limited to 100 notes along with a paid plan for unlimited notes.
