= Notational Velocity =

Notetaking computer program for Mac OS X

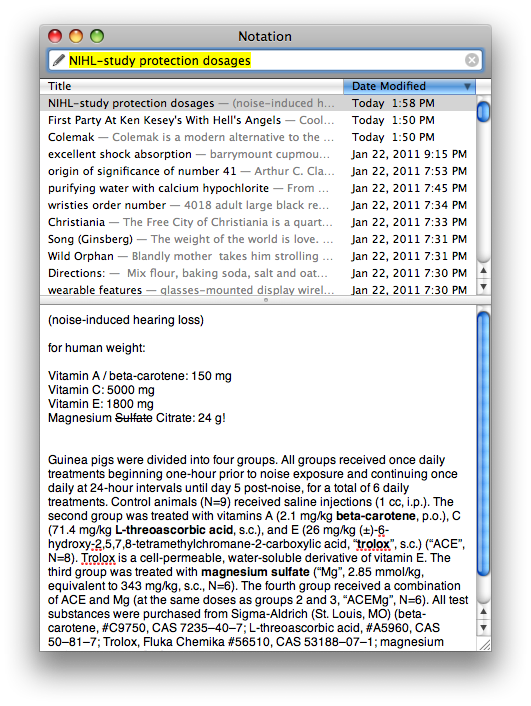
- Notational velocity main window
- Developer: Zachary Schneirov
- Stable release: 2.5.2 / 17 October 2026; 16 days ago
- Operating system: Mac OS X
- Type: Notetaking software
- License: GPL-3.0-or-later
- Website: notational.net
- Repository: github.com/scrod/nv

Notational Velocity is a computer program for Mac OS X used for notetaking. It allows users to create notes using solely a computer keyboard and search them using incremental find. Other features include database encryption, basic text formatting, tags and spellcheck. In addition, users can synchronize notes with Simplenote and export to a variety of formats, including plain text, HTML and rich text. It has been recommended along with Simplenote as a solution for taking and syncing notes by both Wired and Lifehacker.

After an extended hiatus, version 2.5.2 was released in October 2026 with support for macOS Tahoe and newer.

In 2013, Elastic Threads (David Halter) and Brett Terpstra created a fork of Notational Velocity with added functionality called nvALT. nvALT was last updated in October 2026, with features ported from the most recent Notational Velocity release.

== See also ==
- Comparison of notetaking software
