= Windows Journal =

Windows notetaking application

- Windows Journal running on Windows 11
- Developer: Microsoft
- Included with: Windows XP Tablet PC Edition; Windows Vista; Windows 7; Windows 8; Windows 8.1; Windows 10 version 1507 and version 1511
- Successor: OneNote

Windows Journal was a notetaking application created by Microsoft. It allowed the user to create and organize handwritten notes and drawings. It could be used with an ordinary computer mouse to compose a handwritten note, as well as a graphics tablet or a Tablet PC. It was first included with Windows XP Tablet PC Edition, and then later included with selected editions of Windows Vista and later. It was removed in 2016 with the Windows 10 "Anniversary Update" and was succeeded by OneNote. In the following months, patches for Windows 7 and Windows 8.1 were released to uninstall Windows Journal due to security vulnerabilities with the Windows Journal file format (.JNT).

== History ==
=== Initial release ===
The first release of Windows Journal was included with Windows XP Tablet PC Edition.

=== Windows Journal Viewer ===
Windows Journal Viewer, also created by Microsoft, allowed viewing notes created with Windows Journal on other systems without the Tablet PC software. The most recently released version 1.5.2316.0 for Windows 2000, Windows XP and Windows Server 2003 was removed as of March 2016.

=== Windows Vista ===
An update was included with Windows Vista with slight visual changes.

=== Discontinuation and replacements ===
Windows Journal was included with later revisions of Windows. While it didn't receive feature updates, it was still tested for compatibility and patched for security vulnerabilities. Windows Journal was available in the original July 2015 release of Windows 10 (version 1507) and the "November Update" (version 1511), but it was removed in the "Anniversary Update". Windows Journal is now replaced by OneNote, which is integrated into Windows 10. OneNote does not support natively support Windows Journal files, but Microsoft offers the ability to reinstall Journal and a tool for converting Journal files to OneNote files. On July 12, 2016, Microsoft released a patch (KB3170735) for Windows 7 and Windows 8.1 to notify users about future Windows Journal developments. On August 9, 2016, Microsoft released another patch (KB3161102) to remove Windows Journal from Windows 7 and Windows 8.1 due to the Windows Journal file format (Journal Note File, or JNT) being susceptible to security exploits.

On February 17, 2021, Microsoft released an alternative to Windows Journal called Microsoft Journal as a part of the Microsoft Garage program.

== JNT format ==
Microsoft has provided no documentation for its proprietary .JNT file format, which makes it difficult or impossible for other developers or software publishers to read or write .JNT files. Therefore, other programs cannot import Windows Journal files. There can be no third-party applications that make direct use of files created with Windows Journal. .JNT files should be converted to other formats such as XML with the Journal Reader Supplemental Component, for external applications to use.

== See also ==
- Comparison of notetaking software
