= Bloomfire =

Software-as-a-service company

- Industry: software-as-a-service
- Founded: 2010; 16 years ago
- Founder: Josh Little
- Headquarters: Austin, Texas
- Key people: Ben Little(Current CEO); Mark Hammer (Former CEO); Craig Malloy(Former CEO)
- Website: bloomfire.com

Bloomfire is a software-as-a-service company based in Austin, Texas. The business creates web-based software applications that aim to increase virtual knowledge-and-insights-sharing in the workplace. It was founded in 2010 by Josh Little, and originally headquartered in Salt Lake City, Utah. The company is now headquartered in Austin, Texas and is backed by investors such as Austin Ventures. The current CEO is Ben Little.

== Overview ==
Bloomfire products allow companies to share and search for information, insights, and research on a web-based application platform. The software application "Bloomfire", launched in 2012, allows users to create team communities where people can post questions and answers, add or create new content, and search or browse existing content. The software aims to increase accessibility to information within a company so employees have the knowledge they need to work efficiently. The application can be accessed from a device connected to the internet.

Bloomfire supports 53 file types, and content can be uploaded in the form of videos, audio files, images, slide decks, or text documents. The platform also has automatic video and audio transcription capabilities and makes the text of its transcripts searchable.

The application is available for an annual fee, and the company has several hundred customers. Bloomfire provides software for companies such as Capital One, Southwest Airlines, and Conagra. Bloomfire targets its Bloomfire software towards insights and market research, customer support, sales, and marketing teams, but it also applies to other business domains. Users have access to phone and email support, as well as online support.

== History ==
The previous CEO of Bloomfire, Craig Malloy, had an 18-year career in videoconferencing before buying Bloomfire in 2010 with Co-Founder David Mccann.

The current CEO is Mark Hammer, who has been with the company since 2014. Hammer has more than 20 years of experience in leadership with software companies and has previously held senior management roles at SmartBear Software, Houghton Mifflin Harcourt, and Compass Learning.

== Awards and recognition ==
In 2012, Bersin & Associates named Bloomfire in their Learning Leaders Winners in the Vendor Innovation in Learning and Talent Management: Informal Category. In 2012, Bloomfire was named a Brandon Hall Gold Award winner for Best Advance in Social Learning Technology.

Bloomfire received a Brandon Hall Gold Award for Excellence in Technology in 2015. Bloomfire also received a Bronze Stevie Award in 2017 for Sales & Customer Service and a Silver Stevie Award in 2018 for Sales & Customer Service. The company was also named to the Austin Business Journal's list of Best Places to Work in 2015, 2016, and 2018. In 2017, Bloomfire's CFO, Bill Tole, received the Austin Business Journal's Best CFO Award.
