= Treasuremytext =

- Company type: Online services
- Industry: Online Services
- Founded: September 2003
- Headquarters: Liverpool, England
- Website: www.treasuremytext.com

Treasuremytext is an online SMS archive service. Treasuremytext is operated by UK company Kisky Netmedia and was launched in September 2003. Treasuremytext was designed and made by Paul Stringer and Katie Lips.

== History ==
Treasuremytext was created in September 2003. Treasuremytext is owned and operated by Kisky Netmedia, based in Liverpool, United Kingdom. The service was created by Paul Stringer and Katie Lips.

Treasuremytext founders developed the service based on their desire to keep their SMS messages. At this time (2003) it was generally only possible to keep 15 messages on standard mobile phones, and this meant that mobile phone users often had to delete their SMS messages to make room for new ones. The service initially operated using a mobile shortcode available in the UK charging users 25p to save a message at the service. Treasuremytext then went on to operate on a subscription basis charging users £1.50 per month or £12.99 per year. The current service is free to use.

Treasuremytext won a Big Chip Award 2004 in the 'Best use of Wireless Technology' category.
Treasuremytext won a Yahoo! Finds of the Year Award in 2005 in the 'Best Community Website' category.

== Software ==
Treasuremytext works by sending SMS messages to a standard rate mobile number. Messages received are saved in users' accounts. The service enables private storage or public sharing of SMS online. The service uses a UK mobile number. The service also has an 'Treasuremytext for iPhone' based on the Treasuremytext API. The Treasuremytext for iPhone application is released under the GNU General Public License v2 and works in jailbroken iPhones. Treasuremytext is written in Apple's WebObjects a Java development framework.

== Features ==
Features

- SMS Archive
- Outbound Text messaging
- SMS Backup from iPhone
- Share SMS

== Audience ==
Treasuremytext was possibly the first service to enable to publication of an SMS from a mobile phone on a webpage. The service is based on archiving SMS messages. Microblogging and lifestreaming services that also work via SMS 'status updates' Twitter and Jaiku subsequently made SMS to web popular with a Web 2.0 audience. Whilst Treasuremytext can be used to lifestream, its focus is on archiving personal content received from others.
