= Tomboy (software) =

Notetaking application

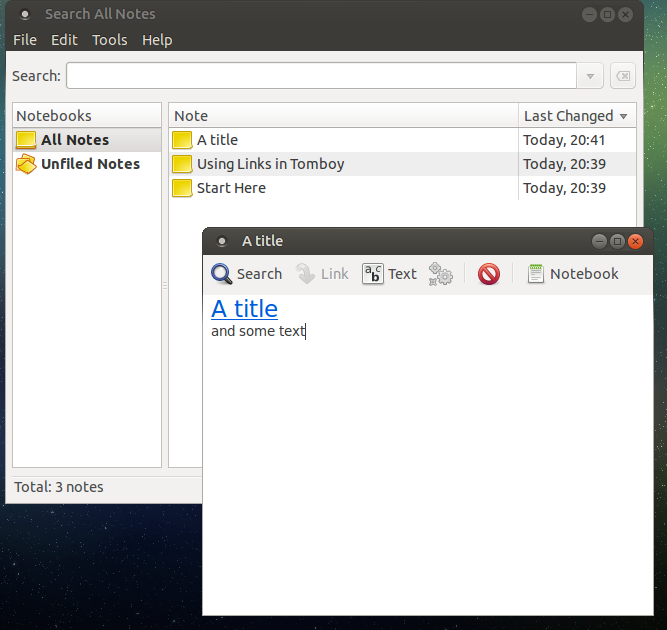
- Tomboy 1.15.4 running on Ubuntu MATE
- Developers: Alex Graveley and Tomboy Contributors
- Stable release: 1.15.9 / 16 July 2017
- Written in: C#
- Operating system: Microsoft Windows, macOS, Linux, BSD
- Platform: Mono
- Type: Note-taking software
- License: LGPL-2.1-only
- Website: projects.gnome.org/tomboy
- Repository: github.com/tomboy-notes/tomboy

Tomboy is a free and open-source desktop note-taking application written for Microsoft Windows, macOS, Linux, and BSD operating systems. Tomboy was part of the GNOME 2 desktop environment. Its interface is a word processor with a wiki-like linking system to connect notes together. Words in the note body that match existing note titles become hyperlinks automatically, making it simple to construct a personal wiki. For example, repeated references to favorite artists would be automatically highlighted in notes containing their names. As of version 1.6 (2010), it supports text entries and hyperlinks to the World Wide Web, but not graphic image linking or embedding.

Development of the original Tomboy software ceased in 2017. Starting that year, the development team rewrote the software in Free Pascal, renaming it tomboy-ng.

== Features ==
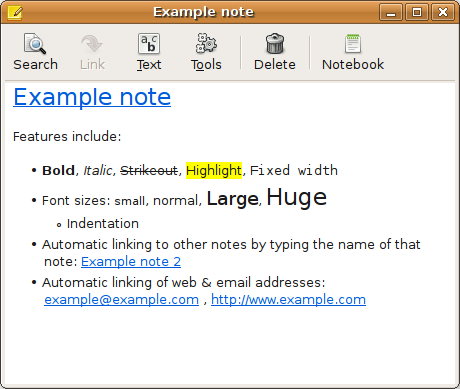
Example note

Some of the editing features supported:

- Text highlighting
- Inline spell checking using GtkSpell
- Automatic hyperlinking of Web and email addresses
- Undo/redo
- Font styling and sizing
- Bulleted lists
- Note synchronization over SSH, WebDAV, Ubuntu One, or the Tomboy REST API that is implemented by several server applications

== Plugins ==
Tomboy supports several plugins, including:

- Evolution mail links
- Galago/Pidgin presence
- Note of the day (disabled by default)
- Fixed width text
- HTML export
- LaTeX math (in the package tomboy-latex, not installed by default)
- Print

== Ports ==
- Conboy: a Tomboy port to the Maemo platform written in the C language
- Gnote: a conversion of the Tomboy code to the C++ language, but is not cross-platform
- libktomgirl: a platform-independent library that reads and writes the Tomboy File Format
- Tomdroid: an effort to produce a Tomboy-compatible notetaking app for the Android operating system.

== See also ==
- Comparison of note-taking software
