= Mobile PhoneTools =

mobile PhoneTools
- Developer: Avanquest
- Stable release: 5.17d / May 14, 2009; 16 years ago
- Operating system: Microsoft Windows
- Type: Personal information manager
- License: Commercial
- Website: www.Avanquest.com

mobile PhoneTools is a program written by the French-based company Avanquest Software (formerly BVRP). The program allows users of Motorola and other brands of cellular phones to connect their cellular phones to their personal computer.

mobile PhoneTools is distributed as an OEM product with Motorola phones by some telcos. The Motorola edition of the software is called Motorola PhoneTools. mobile PhoneTools is sold online as a retail product as well. Another version of mobile PhoneTools, called Mobile Phone Suite, is a special edition designed to work with the Intel Centrino dual-core chip.

mobile PhoneTools requires Bluetooth, data cable, or IrDA connection to operate. The retail version can be purchased as a bundle with either a Bluetooth dongle or a data cable.

Following functionalities are included in the retail version of mobile PhoneTools:

- Synchronizing of phonebook and calendar with personal information manager (e.g. Microsoft Outlook).
- Connecting the computer to the Internet via cell phone's data service (e.g. GPRS, EDGE).
- Reading and composing text messages or emails on the computer.
- Transferring of sound, image, and video files between computer and cell phone. (does not support Java ME MIDlets)
- Updating cell phone firmware.

== Reception ==
Bruce Brown for PCMag gave the program a four out of five.
