= Ulysses (text editor) =

Text editor for Mac OS X

- Developers: The Soulmen - Ulysses GmbH & Co. KG
- Stable release: 36 / 29 October 2024; 14 months ago
- Operating system: macOS, iPadOS, iOS
- Platform: Apple
- Type: Text editor / Word processor
- License: SaaS, proprietary
- Website: http://www.ulysses.app

Ulysses is a text editor for Apple macOS, iPad, and iPhone. It is targeted at creative writers who wish to eliminate concerns regarding text layout, formatting, or other distractions, allowing them to concentrate on their writing. It supports Markdown for basic formatting.

== History ==
Ulysses was named after the novel by James Joyce.

The Ulysses software was originally released for MacOS and in version 2.5 support was added for iPhone and iPad.

Ulysses 2.0 became the next milestone version of Ulysses. A 2.0 public beta was released in 2009. With the release of Ulysses 2.0, the software was re-branded under the name of The Soulmen. The major upgrade included a new interface, bookmarks for texts, a Document Trash and Project Templates. In addition, all parts of the software have been receiving updates.

The license for Ulysses has been a subscription model (SaaS) since version 11. The standard version of Ulysses is also available on Setapp.

On June 13, 2016, the software was awarded the Apple Design Award.

In 2024, the software was updated to the 35th version.

== See also ==
- List of text editors
- Comparison of text editors
