= CintaNotes =

Microsoft Windows notetaking program

- Typical CintaNotes Session
- Developer: Cinta Software
- Stable release: 3.14 (Freemium) / September 11, 2023; 3 years ago
- Operating system: Windows
- Type: Personal Notes Manager
- License: EULA
- Website: cintanotes.com

CintaNotes is a freemium Microsoft Windows notetaking program. It provides a way to store and retrieve text collected from other documents or websites. Since version 3.0 CintaNotes supports attaching files and images to notes.

CintaNotes supports clipping text from any application via a hotkey and also captures the web or local file link. The program allows tags and has instant search based on tags, text, links or date. The entire database or individually selected notes can be exported into either Unicode text or XML format.

== Features ==
- Organization — notes are organized using tags. The main window is divided into two parts: a tag list on the left side (sorted alphabetically) and notes on the right side. Which notes are displayed depend on which tag or tags are selected. Multiple tags can be selected to show only notes with all tags, or to show notes with some tags but not others.
- Notes — each note is plain text with an optional title and optional tags. All of these parts are displayed in the notes list.

== See also ==
- Comparison of notetaking software
- Notetaking
