= QOwnNotes =

Note taking app with markdown support

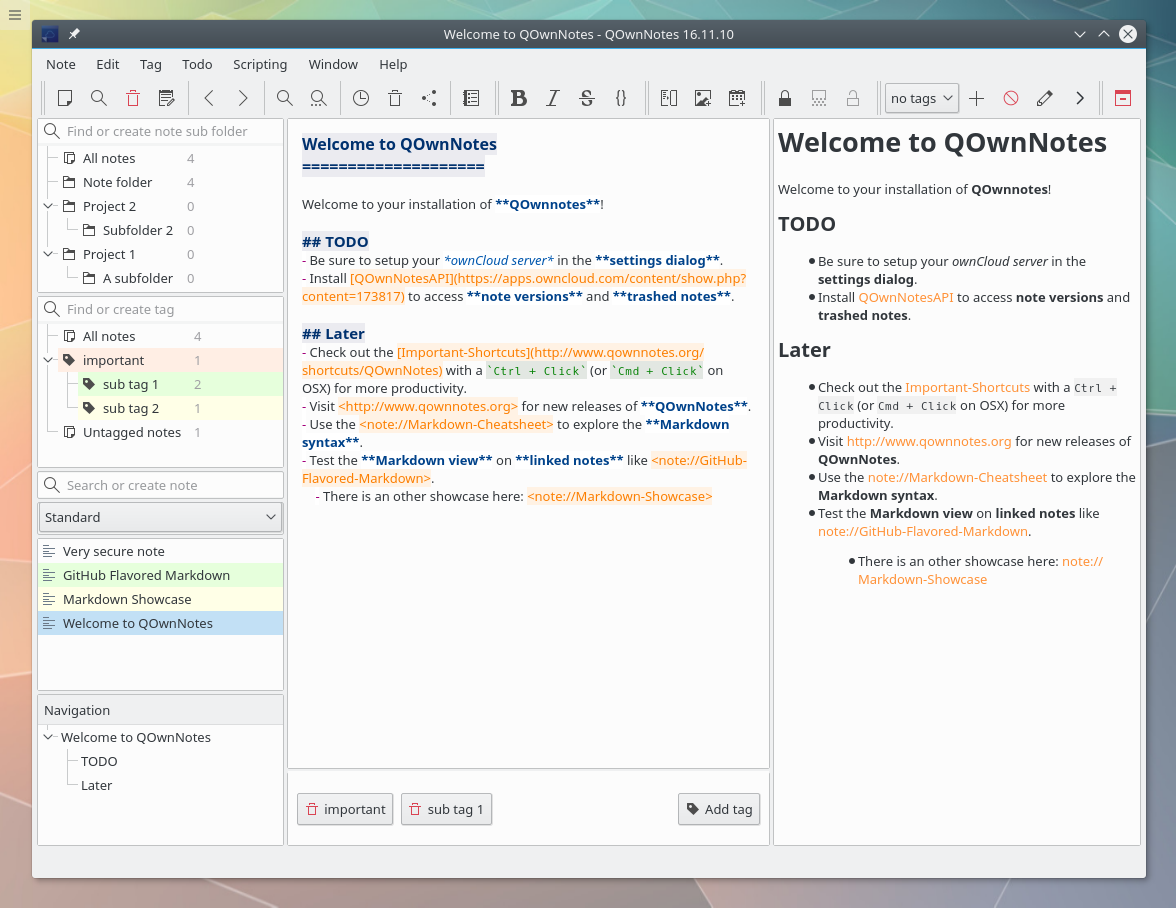
- Screenshot of QOwnNotes main screen
- Developer: Patrizio Bekerle
- Stable release: 26.9.12 (26 September 2026) [±]
- Written in: C++ (Qt)
- Operating system: Cross-platform
- Type: Productivity software
- License: GPL-2.0-only
- Website: www.qownnotes.org
- Repository: github.com/pbek/QOwnNotes

QOwnNotes is a free open source (GPL) plain-text notepad. The program has support for markdown, and includes a to-do list manager that works on FreeBSD, Linux, MacOS and Windows. It can optionally work together with the notes application of ownCloud or Nextcloud.

== History ==
In a 2017 interview, Bekerle traced the project's origins to late 2014, when he wanted a cross-platform application that could create notes with a keyboard shortcut and store them as text files in a directory for synchronization. Version 1.0 was announced in February 2016.

== Features ==
The editor provides Markdown syntax highlighting and a preview of the formatted document. Notes can be organized into subfolders and assigned hierarchical tags. The interface has panels that can be moved, docked or stacked, and the application supports optional AES-256 encryption of notes. Notes can also be exported as PDF or HTML documents.

The application can be extended with JavaScript scripts contained in QML files. Scripts can modify the interface and note preview or provide alternative encryption methods.

QOwnNotes stores notes on the local filesystem, where they can also be edited with other text editors. Synchronization of notes and attachments is handled by a separate client, such as the Nextcloud or ownCloud desktop client. Its server integration supports sharing notes and accessing task lists. The QOwnNotesAPI server application provides access to earlier note versions and deleted notes.

== Reviews ==
Linux Magazine, Linux Format, Linux Voice and Web Upd8 reviewed QOwnNotes. There is a more elaborate list of reviews and articles about QOwnNotes.

Reviewing version 16.05 in the August 2016 issue of Linux Format, Alexander Tolstoy praised the application's ease of use and highlighted its Markdown examples, document preview and automatically generated heading index.

In a February 2025 review for The PCLinuxOS Magazine, David Pardue praised its configurable interface, low resource use and local plain-text storage. He tested version 25.1.3, but reported that he could not get the QOwnNotes Web Companion browser extension to work, including after trying an older packaged version of the application.

== See also ==
- Comparison of note-taking software
