= Obsidian (software) =

Knowledge base and note-taking software

- Original authors: Shida Li; Erica Xu
- Developer: Dynalist Inc.
- Release: March 30, 2020; 6 years ago
- Stable release: 1.14.4 / 5 October 2026; 9 days ago
- Preview release: 1.14.4 / 1 October 2026; 13 days ago
- Written in: JavaScript, HTML, CSS
- Operating system: Windows, macOS, Android, Linux, iOS
- Available in: 46 languages
- Type: Personal knowledge base; personal information manager
- License: Proprietary
- Website: obsidian.md
- Repository: github.com/obsidianmd

Obsidian is a proprietary personal knowledge base and note-taking application that operates on Markdown files. The software is free for personal and commercial use; only the offered cloud services, optional commercial licenses, and early access versions are paid. It is available as desktop versions for macOS, Windows and Linux as well as for mobile operating systems such as iOS and Android, but not as a web application.

== History ==
Shida Li and Erica Xu, the two co-founders of Obsidian, met while studying at the University of Waterloo. They collaborated on several development projects before creating Obsidian, including the outliner tool Dynalist.

When the COVID-19 pandemic struck and they were left quarantining, they started working on Obsidian. Its development was motivated by shortcomings in other tools like MediaWiki, TiddlyWiki, and other note-taking apps. The idea was to build an app that was extensible like code editors and IDEs.

Obsidian's first beta release occurred on March 30, 2020, followed by the launch of version 1.0.0 on October 13, 2022, after two years of beta development. In December of the same year, Obsidian introduced its Canvas feature for spatial note-taking.

On February 6, 2023, Steph Ango joined Obsidian as CEO after his contributions to Obsidian version 1.0.0 and involvement in the community. Previously, he had been working at the startup Lumi before it was acquired in 2021.

== Availability ==
Obsidian is available on all major operating systems, including Windows, Linux, macOS, iOS, and Android. It is not available as a web app. Obsidian is free for both personal and commercial use; though they offer subscription-based premium services, an optional commercial license, and one-time payment to access beta versions of Obsidian.

== Usage ==
Obsidian is a note-taking application that works with Markdown files and can be used for personal knowledge management and building a knowledge database. It is designed to help users organize and structure their thoughts and knowledge in a flexible, non-linear way.

Obsidian has been used for a wide variety of use-cases, in large part due to the extensibility of the app through plugins, which allow users to tailor Obsidian to their needs by keeping it as simple or advanced as needed. Some use-cases include writing, task management, and learning.

According to a 2023 Fast Company article, Obsidian estimates it has approximately one million users based on GitHub download counts. The article also reports that the app's Discord server has more than 110,000 members and its Reddit community has about 94,600 members, which ranks it in the top 5% of Reddit communities.

== Features ==
Obsidian operates on a folder of text documents named a "vault"; each new note in Obsidian generates a new text document, and all documents can be searched from within the app. Text formatting in Obsidian is achieved through Markdown, with the ability to switch between a raw text (Source Mode) and a pre-rendered (Live Preview) mode while editing.

Obsidian is not prescriptive about how users organize their notes. Bases is a core plugin that enables users to create database-like views of their notes, which can be customized to look like dynamic tables or even maps. Canvas, another core plugin, provides a freeform, infinite 2D space where users can arrange and connect notes, attachments, and embedded web pages.

=== Plugins and customization ===
Users may customize Obsidian by using community-developed, open-source plugins and themes, which extend the software's functionality or customize the appearance of the app. Obsidian's plugin ecosystem is large, with plugins to support a variety of workflows and use-cases. Its plugins supply features that are available in other note-taking apps, though it requires significant time to properly tailor the app to one's liking.

=== Linking and graph view ===
Obsidian allows internal linking between notes, formatted either as Wikilinks or traditional Markdown links. Links appear in Obsidian's interactive graph view.

The graph view is a visualization of notes in the vault and the connections between them. It is composed of nodes representing files (typically Markdown documents) and edges between nodes representing the internal links that connect notes together.

Obsidian has been described as a tool that facilitates a digital form of the Zettelkasten method, a note-taking methodology based on interlinked knowledge, due to its linking features. Access to a broad overview of a vault and to the connections among notes enables the discovery of relationships that may not be apparent when a single note is examined in isolation.

=== Premium services ===
Obsidian offers two subscription-based services: Obsidian Sync and Obsidian Publish. Sync is an encrypted file-synchronization service that synchronizes notes across devices. Publish is a web-hosting service that allows users to upload their notes to a dedicated website.

Alternatives to Obsidian's premium services are available because users store notes locally on their devices. File-hosting services or peer-to-peer file sharing tools can be used for cross-device sync, though it is less convenient and something that other note-taking apps offer for free. Users can also publish vault content to the web using community plugins.

== Reception ==
Obsidian has been praised by reviewers for its flexibility and many customization options. A reviewer at PCMag wrote about community plugins and themes enabling a wide variety of use-cases and workflows in Obsidian. Another reviewer at Fast Company said that Obsidian is not prescriptive about how users organize their notes, giving them a variety of options and formats for doing so.

Obsidian has been criticized for its learning curve and unfriendliness to beginners. Reviewers argue that Markdown can be challenging for users who are unfamiliar with it. Others complain that useful and requested features are only available as community plugins, requiring time to understand and tailor to one's needs.

== See also ==
- Comparison of note-taking software
- Comparison of wiki software
- List of wiki software § Personal wiki software
