= Logseq =

Personal knowledge base and note-taking software

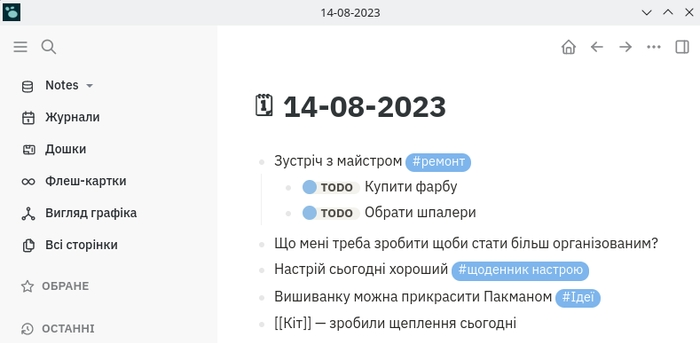
- Original author: Tienson Qin
- Developer: Logseq Inc
- Release: 1 October 2020; 5 years ago
- Stable release: 0.10.15 / 1 December 2025; 9 months ago
- Written in: Clojure, TypeScript
- Platform: Windows, macOS, Android, Linux, iOS, BSD
- Type: Personal knowledge base; personal information manager
- License: AGPL-3.0
- Website: logseq.com
- Repository: github.com/logseq/logseq

Logseq is a free and open-source, personal knowledge base and note-taking application which can store data locally. It supports both Markdown and org-mode syntax.

== History ==
Tienson Qin started Logseq as a platform to store interconnected information on infinite graphs which would run on any device.

Logseq Inc was formed with An Vu, Huang Peng, Tienson Qin, and ZhiYuan Chen as founders, which raised over $4.1M for the growth. This seed funding round included investments from Stripe CEO Patrick Collison, Shopify CEO Tobias Lütke, and ex-GitHub CEO Nat Friedman.

Logseq is being used at Google Brain, IDEO, Meta, Tesla, MIT, Stanford and Harvard.

== Features ==
Logseq works with plaintext formats like Markdown and org-mode, which are stored locally on a user's device to offer privacy and ownership of data.

The software has been toted as a tool working with the low cost Raspberry Pi platform to create DIY personal information management systems.

== See also ==
- Comparison of note-taking software – Comparison of computer software designed for taking notes
- Comparison of wiki software – Software to run a collaborative wiki compared
