= MyInfo =

Personal information manager

- MyInfo Icon
- MyInfo 8
- Developer: Milenix Software
- Release: October 26, 1999; 26 years ago
- Stable release: 8.5.4 / May 15, 2026; 2 months ago
- Operating system: Windows 7, Windows 8, Windows 8.1, Windows 10, and Windows 11
- Type: Personal information manager
- License: Proprietary (shareware)
- Website: www.myinfoapp.com

MyInfo is a personal information manager developed by Milenix Software. MyInfo collects, organizes, edit, stores, and retrieves personal-reference information like text documents, web snippets, e-mails, notes, and files from other applications.

MyInfo 7 adds speed improvements, perspectives, updated user interface, multiple attachments per note, multiple sections per notebook and more.

MyInfo 8 introduces dark mode, Markdown-style shortcuts, nested tags, code snippets support, note structure pane, and a new Go To Anything command.

MyInfo uses both hierarchical, and folder-like structures along with tags, categories and other meta-information for organizing its content. It is one of the several PIM applications for Windows to do so.

MyInfo imports data from different third-party applications, most notably AskSam.

The software is used as a free-form personal information manager, personal wiki, outliner, personal knowledge base, game master tool, GTD filing system and others.

== Awards ==
Nominated for Best Business Application by Software Industry Conference for their Shareware Industry Awards in 2003.
