= Notion (productivity software) =

Productivity web application

- Developers: Notion Labs, Inc.
- Release: 2016; 10 years ago
- Stable release: 3.8 / 13 October 2026
- Operating system: Microsoft Windows; macOS; Android; iOS; Web
- Available in: English, French, German, Japanese, Korean, Spanish, Spanish (Latin America), Danish (Beta), Dutch (Beta), Finnish (Beta), Norwegian (Beta), Swedish (Beta), Indonesian, Thai, Vietnamese, Simplified Chinese, Traditional Chinese
- Type: Note-taking, Wiki (Knowledge management software, Collaborative software)
- License: Proprietary software, Freemium
- Website: www.notion.com

Notion is a productivity and note-taking application developed by Notion Labs, Inc. It serves as a workspace for notetaking, knowledge management, data organization, and project and task tracking. It was first released in 2016 and is available on the web and as desktop and mobile apps. The company is headquartered in San Francisco.

== History ==
Notion Labs, Inc. was created as a startup in San Francisco, California, founded in 2013 by Ivan Zhao, Akshay Kothari, Chris Prucha, Jessica Lam, Simon Last, and Toby Schachman. It was funded by an initial seed round of around $2 million. The company encountered financial challenges during early development of the app. Notion 1.0 released in August 2016, which was quickly adopted by tech enthusiasts.

In March 2018, Notion 2.0 was released. At that point, the company had fewer than 10 employees.

In September 2019, the company announced it had reached 1 million users.

In January 2020, Notion raised $50 million from Index Ventures and others, valuing the company at $2 billion. In May of that same year, the company announced that users on its free plan will be able to create unlimited "blocks," where they were previously restricted to 1,000 before needing to pay for premium.

Notion acquired an India-based startup, Automate.io, which develops integrations between a variety of services in September 2021. A month later in October, in a round of funding led by Coatue Management and Sequoia Capital, Notion raised $275 million. The investment valued Notion at $10 billion, and the company had 20 million users.

Notion acquired Cron, a calendar app, on June 9, 2022, which Notion later developed into Notion Calendar. Notion Calendar, launched on January 17, 2024, was its first standalone app and offered greater integration with Notion and a scheduling tool similar to Calendly.

In February 2023, Notion released the "Notion AI" chatbot service that can be used on the workspace.

Notion acquired Skiff on February 9, 2024, whose infrastructure would later be used for Notion Mail. Notion Mail released in April 2025 as a Gmail-based email client with Notion AI integration, intended to assist users draft replies, schedule meetings, and search across messages.

In April 2025, Notion was featured in the Forbes "AI 50 list".

In September 2025, Notion launched version 3.0, which includes an AI agent feature.

In May 2026, Notion launched the Notion Developer Platform, introducing Workers, a cloud-based environment for running custom code in a secure sandbox, database sync for pulling live data from external sources such as Salesforce and Zendesk into Notion databases, and external agent integration allowing users to assign work to and track agents including Claude Code, Cursor, Codex, and Decagon directly within their workspace. The company reported that users had built over one million Custom Agents since the feature launched in February 2026.

In June 2026, Notion announced that it would shut down Notion Mail across web, desktop and iOS on September 22, 2026. The company said it would instead focus on agent-based email workflows, noting that users would need to export drafts, scheduled emails, snippets and auto-label instructions before the shutdown, while most messages would remain available through Gmail.

== Products and features ==
Notion is a collaboration platform with kanban boards, tasks, wikis and databases. It serves as a workspace for notetaking, knowledge management, data organization, and project and task tracking. It is accessible via cross-platform apps and most web browsers.

Notes consist of "blocks," which make up every line or paragraph. These can contain text, images, subpages, and databases. Databases can display information about pages in different views, including tables, lists, calendars, and timelines.

Notion uses AI and a library of free and fee-based templates. Notion AI assists users in writing and improving content, summarizing existing notes, adjusting tone, and translating or checking text.

== See also ==
- Collaborative real-time editor
- Document collaboration
- Comparison of note-taking software
