= Joplin (software) =

Notetaking application

- Joplin 1.0.218 running in the GNOME desktop environment on Fedora Linux 32
- Developer: Laurent Cozic
- Release: 2017; 9 years ago
- Stable release: 3.7.18 / 11 September 2026; 13 days ago
- Written in: TypeScript, JavaScript
- Operating system: Linux, macOS, Microsoft Windows, Android, iOS
- Platform: Electron, React Native
- Type: Note-taking application
- License: AGPL License, Joplin Server Personal Use License
- Website: joplinapp.org
- Repository: github.com/laurent22/joplin

Joplin is a free and open-source desktop and mobile note-taking and to-do list application written for Unix-like (including macOS and Linux) and Microsoft Windows operating systems, as well as iOS, Android, and Linux/Windows terminals, written in JavaScript. The desktop app is made using Electron, while the mobile app uses React Native.

The server part of the app is provided under the noncommercial Joplin Server Personal Use License.

== History ==
Joplin is named after the ragtime composer and pianist, Scott Joplin.

Laurent Cozic started work on Joplin in 2016, and the first CLI version was released on 12 July 2017, followed by the Android version on 28 July 2017.

The first public desktop application release was version 0.10.19, on 20 November 2017.

A Web Clipper for Chrome was introduced in December 2017 and the Firefox extension was released in May 2018.

A new Joplin Cloud service was introduced in 2021, along with an on-premises Joplin Server application. Both products can be used to sync notes, to-dos, notebooks and note data across devices, as well as share notes or notebooks with other Joplin users, or even publish content to the web.

== Features ==
- Notes in markdown format
- To-do list which loosely implements Getting Things Done methodology
- Markdown extension plug-ins
- Storage in a SQLite database
- Optional client-side encryption
- Organisation in notebooks and sub-notebooks
- Tagging system
- "Offline-first", notes are always accessible locally, and can be synced on demand
- Web clipper for Firefox and Chrome
- Note synchronization with Joplin Cloud, Nextcloud, Dropbox, OneDrive, WebDAV, or (networked) file system

Joplin's workflow and featureset is most often compared to Evernote.

== See also ==
- Comparison of note-taking software
