= List of wiki software =

This is a list of wiki software programs. They are grouped by use case: standard wiki programs, personal wiki programs, hosted-only wikis, wiki-based content management software, and wiki-based project management software. They are further subdivided by the language of implementation: JavaScript, Java, PHP, Python, Perl, Ruby, and so on.

== Standard wiki programs, by programming language ==
=== JavaScript-based ===
- TiddlyWiki is a HTML-JavaScript-based server-less wiki in which the entire site/wiki is contained in a single file, or as a Node.js-based wiki application. It is designed for maximum customization possibilities.
- Wiki.js is an open-source, Node.js-based wiki application using git as the back end storage mechanism and automatically syncs with any git repository. It provides a visual Markdown editor with assets management, authentication system and a built-in search engine.

=== Java-based ===
- XWiki is a free wiki software platform written in Java with a design emphasis on extensibility. XWiki is an enterprise wiki engine with a complete wiki feature set (version control, attachments, etc.) and a database engine and programming language which allows database driven applications to be created using the wiki interface.

=== Perl-based ===
- Foswiki is a structured wiki, typically used to run a collaboration platform, knowledge or document management system a knowledge based, or team portal, which enables users to create "wiki applications".
- ikiwiki, a "wiki compiler" - can use Subversion or git as the back end storage mechanism. ikiwiki converts wiki pages into HTML pages suitable for publishing on a website.
- TWiki is a flexible, powerful, secure, simple Enterprise wiki and application platform. is a structured wiki, typically used to run a project development space, a document management system, a knowledge base, or any other groupware tool. Also available as a VMware appliance.
- UseModWiki is a wiki software written in Perl and licensed under General Public License. Created by Clifford Adams in 2000, it is a clone of AtisWiki.
- WikiWikiWeb, the first wiki and its associated software.

=== PHP-based ===
- BookStack is released under the MIT License. It uses the ideas of books to organize pages and store information.
- DokuWiki is a wiki application licensed under GPLv2 and written in PHP. It is aimed at the documentation needs of a small company. DokuWiki was built for small companies and organizations that need a simple way to manage information, build knowledge bases and collaborate. It uses plain text files and has a simple but powerful syntax which ensures the datafiles remain readable outside the wiki.
- MediaWiki is a free and open-source wiki software package written in PHP. It serves as the platform for Wikipedia and the other Wikimedia projects run by the Wikimedia Foundation. It is also publicly available for use in other wikis, and has widespread popularity among smaller, non-Wikimedia wikis. MediaWiki is a free and open-source wiki software. It was developed for use on Wikipedia in 2002, and given the name "MediaWiki" in 2003.
  - Semantic MediaWiki lets you store and query data within the wiki's pages like a database. It is also designed to ease and combine collaborative authoring within a wiki with semantic technology.
  - BlueSpice extends MediaWiki in usability, quality management, process support, administration, editing and security.
- MindTouch is an application that began as a fork of MediaWiki; it has a C# back-end and a PHP front-end.
- PhpWiki is a WikiWikiWeb clone in PHP.
- PmWiki is a PHP-based wiki. Features include: GPL-licensed, easy installation/customization, designed for collaborative authoring and maintenance of web sites, and support for internationalization. Does not require a database.

=== Python-based ===
- LocalWiki is a wiki engine based on Django, with mapping features and a WYSIWYG editor. The LocalWiki project was founded by DavisWiki creators Mike Ivanov and Philip Neustrom and is a 501 nonprofit organization based in San Francisco.
- MoinMoin is a wiki engine written in Python.
- Trac is an enhanced wiki and issue tracking system for software development projects.

=== Ruby-based ===
- Gollum uses git as the backend storage mechanism. It is written mostly in Ruby and was originally used as GitHub's wiki system.

=== Other languages ===
- Cliki is written in Common Lisp.
- FlexWiki is written in C#, uses the .NET framework, and stores data in files or Microsoft SQL Server. Development stopped in 2009.
- Swiki is written in Squeak. It runs on common platforms, including Macintosh, Windows, Linux, and others.
- Wiki Server is proprietary software distributed with Mac OS X Server.

== Personal wiki software ==
There are also wiki applications designed for personal use, apps for mobile use, and apps for use from USB flash drives. They often include more features than traditional wikis, including:

- Dynamic tree views of the wiki
- Drag-and-drop support for images, text and video, mathematics
- Use of OLE or Linkback to allow wikis to act as relational superstructures for multiple desktop-type documents
- Multimedia embedding, with links to internal aspects of movies, soundtracks, notes and comments
- Macros and macro scripting

A list of such software:

- ConnectedText was a commercial Windows-based personal wiki system with features including full text searches, visual link tree, customizable interface, image and file control, CSS-based page display, exports to HTML and HTML Help, and plug-ins.
- Joplin is an open-source note-taking app that uses markdown.
- Microsoft OneNote is note taking software with a structure of notebooks, sections, and pages that can include fonts, media, links to other notes, and hyperlinks.
- Obsidian is a knowledge base and note-taking software application that operates on Markdown files.
- Journler was a free, open-source personal information manager with personal wiki features for OS X.
- MyInfo is a commercial, Windows-based personal information manager with wiki features.
- smasi App is a simple wiki for local use on Android, iOS, MacOS or Windows. The personal knowledge base is stored directly on the device.
- TiddlyWiki is a free, open-source personal use (single-machine) wiki based on HTML/JavaScript for any browser and OS. It supports customization and a wide range of add-ons.
- Vimwiki is a personal wiki for the text editor Vim. It operates on interlinked, plain text files written in one of several markup languages and provides features such as HTML export, search, outlined notes and tasks, tagging and auto-formatted tables.
- Org-mode is an add-on for Emacs that provides wiki functionality, amongs other things.
- WhizFolders was a commercial Windows-based personal wiki software with rich text wiki items that support inserting links to other wiki items or external files.
- Zim is a free, open-source standalone wiki based on Python and GTK with a WYSIWYG editor.

== Hosted-only software ==
- Elium (previously Knowledge Plaza) is a European knowledge management tool that provides a wiki environment for knowledge work or company-wide teams.
- Confluence is a cloud knowledge management system based (primarily) around a wiki format. It was previously available as on-premises software.

== Content management and social software with wiki functionality ==
=== Java-based ===
- ConcourseConnect is a freely available J2EE application made by Concursive which brings together Corporate Social Networking, Online Community, Business directory, and Customer relationship management capabilities. Features include wiki, blog, document management, ratings, reviews, online classified advertising, and project management modules. The wiki allows both wiki markup and WYSIWYG editing.
- IBM Connections is an Enterprise Social Software made by IBM which combines Wikis, Blogs, Files, Forums, Microblogging, Social Analytics, and document management.
- Jive (formerly known as Clearspace, Jive SBS and Jive Engage) is a commercial J2EE application, made by Jive Software, which combines wiki, blog and document management functionality. Jive uses WYSIWYG editing, and includes workflow management.
- Liferay is an open source enterprise portal project with a built-in web content management and web application framework. Core portlets offer a great number of functionalities, including Wiki (both Creole and MediaWiki syntax).
- Mindquarry creates a WYSIWYG wiki for each team. It is built using Apache Cocoon and thus based on Java (Mozilla Public License)
- Traction TeamPage is a commercial enterprise wiki also incorporating blog, project management, document management, discussion and tagging capabilities. The wiki has a draft moderation capability allowing administrators to indicate who can read published vs. draft versions, and who can publish vs. author and edit. The dynamic view architecture allows for easy organization of pages and to collect any set of pages for view, email or export. It is based on the principles of Douglas Engelbart's On-Line System (NLS) which aggregates multiple blog/wiki spaces using a sophisticated permission and inline comment model.
- XWiki includes the standard wiki functionality as well as WYSIWYG editing, OpenDocument based document import/export, semantic annotations and tagging, and advanced permissions management.

=== Perl-based ===
- Socialtext is a company based in Palo Alto, California, that produces enterprise social software, enterprise wiki and weblog engine partially derived from open-source Kwiki. Socialtext is available as a hosted service, or a dedicated hardware appliance.

=== PHP-based ===
- Drupal installations can be configured as wikis with MediaWiki-style wiki markup.
- Tiki Wiki CMS Groupware is one of the larger and more ambitious wiki development projects, including a variety of additional groupware features (message forums, articles, etc.).

=== Other languages ===
- Microsoft SharePoint is a web-based collaborative platform that integrates with Microsoft Office. Launched in 2001, SharePoint is primarily sold as a document management and storage system, but the product is highly configurable and its usage varies substantially among organizations. It has built-in wiki support. It is built on ASP.NET, C# language and Microsoft SQL Server.
- Telligent, A Verint Company is an enterprise collaboration and community software business founded in 2004 by Rob Howard. The company changed its name to Zimbra, Inc in September 2013 after completing the acquisition of Zimbra from VMWare. In August 2015 Zimbra's Telligent business was acquired by Verint Systems.

== Project management software with wiki functionality ==
- Altova MetaTeam integrates a wiki and glossary with project management, collaborative decision-making and team performance management
- Code Co-op is a distributed revision control system with wiki functionality.
- Fossil is a distributed revision control system that integrates a distributed wiki capability, written in C.
- Redmine is a project management web application.
- Trac integrates simple issue tracking and an interface to Subversion.

== See also ==
- Comparison of wiki software
- History of wikis
- Wiki survey
