= Victoria Campbell =

American artist and writer (born 1989)

- Education: Cooper Union financial crisis and tuition protests
- Known for: Contemporary art
- Website: viki.wiki

Victoria Campbell (born 1989) is an American artist and writer based in New York. Her work has been published and exhibited internationally. She was one half of the artist duo Campbell Carolan and co-founded the arts-related technology company Visit, Inc. She is a contributing editor of Spike Art Magazine and publishes Federated Wiki client-server software.

== Career ==
Bruce High Quality Foundation's 2012 Brucennial, Harderer. Betterer. Fasterer. Strongerer., at 159 Bleecker Street in New York, A "highly recognizable spot painting" was attributed to her. Her essays This is Why We Can't Have Nice Things and Art After Work document the Post-Internet generation's critical re-evaluation of the production of value in art history and the art market with a phone. In 2015, Campbell participated in Body Anxiety, an online exhibition curated by Leah Schrager and Jennifer Chan. Her contribution, The Penelope Files, combined a spoken self-interview with a recording of her browsing and moving files on her computer. Reviewing the exhibition for Furtherfield, Laura González drew attention to the repeated movement of files across the screen as a meditation on the production of self.

Campbell exhibited in Memory Room, a group exhibition curated by Andrew Ross at Outpost Gallery in Ridgewood, Queens, from June 10 to 24, 2016. Her work Model for an interior element (2015) was a fly trap covered in broken glass.

She also participated in the Knockdown Center's Bloomsday exhibition, based on James Joyce's Ulysses. The eighteen artists were each assigned a chapter from the novel to interpret using objects, structures, sound, video, performance, and food.

Campbell collaborated with Micaela Carolan as Campbell Carolan from 2012 to 2022. Campbell collaborated with Micaela Carolan as Campbell Carolan from 2012 to 2022. The duo combined performance with an erudite, conceptual approach to art's institutional production alongside contemporaries like Jayson Musson, Nandi Loaf, Brad Troemel, Josh Citarella, Ann Hirsch and Marisa Olson, the latter of whom coined the term postinternet in a redefinition of fields performance art, institutional critique and conceptual art. In 2015 the duo presented Soft Skills, a performance treating the future of work as an online-dating scenario, at Red Bull Studios, New York, commissioned by Powrplnt for Ryder Ripps. Following the debut of HAMSTERMACHINE at the 13th st Repertory theatre in New York, a one-act play that drew its dialogue from Red Pill Reddit threads, namely Red Pill Women boards, they hosted a series of dry events for which a rotating staff women artists was asked to make dinner for an all-male guest list billed as a relational aesthetics kitchen. Campbell Carolan's play, NAFTA Miami, adapted David Mamet's Glengarry Glen Ross using language appropriated from exhibition texts and press releases to satirize the dialect of American art english. It was broadcast in Dimes Square starring gallery toughs .

In 2018, Campbell launched a startup to develop a mobile application for studio visits. The company, Visit, Inc., was incorporated in January 2019 and focused on software for the art trade. In 2019, Campbell led a team developing an implementation of the Artist's Reserved Rights Transfer and Sale Agreement, originally written by Seth Siegelaub and Robert Projansky in 1971, on the Ethereum blockchain. Her CV identifies the project as a third-place entry in the ConsenSys Summer Hackathon, alongside Patrick Steadman.

Campbell contributed to Social Photography VIII at Carriage Trade in 2020 and Social Photography X in 2022–2023.

Beginning in 2020, Campbell worked with Federated Wiki, the open-source publishing system originally developed by Ward Cunningham. Her subsequent work has included software development and the operation of networked publishing sites.

=== Institutional development ===
Campbell developed coursework at the Bruce High Quality Foundation University and elsewhere, including an experimental think tank formed at the university.

In a 2018 essay for The Creative Independent, artist and researcher Caroline Sinders compared Campbell's approach to Tania Bruguera's concept of Arte Útil, in which art functions as a tool for social engagement.

In October 2012, Campbell participated in "A Year, a Month, and a Day: Looking Back on Occupy", a roundtable organized by the Platypus Affiliated Society at New York University. The discussion examined the achievements, limitations, and political prospects of Occupy Wall Street. At the time, she was a host of Pacifica Radio on WBAI covering the protests. Other panelists included Fritz Tucker, Victoria Sobel, Shyam Khanna, and David Haack; Lisa Montanarelli moderated.

On June 8, 2013, Campbell spoke alongside Ben Blumberg and Chris Mansour in "Art and the Commodity Form", a panel and guided discussion held at Pace University. The panel considered the production, circulation, and reception of art, and whether practices such as institutional critique, social practice, and art education could challenge art's market and institutional status.

== Networked publishing and AI ==
Campbell publishes Federated Wiki, originally developed by Ward Cunningham, for use by artists at no charge. The software allows independently operated wiki sites to share and remix content while retaining separate site identities and histories. Her contribution has been to publish and organize digital research and exhibition materials and to develop plugins capable of interpreting this material. Campbell's GitHub account includes repositories for Federated Wiki plugins, several of which are forks of existing projects in the Federated Wiki ecosystem.

In 2022, Campbell received a grant from the Urbit Foundation to research the valuation of Urbit's decentralized computing network from the perspective of network effects. She subsequently developed networked publishing projects using wildcard DNS, including viki.wiki and ubu.wiki, the latter drawing on the digital art archive UbuWeb.

Campbell was a listed speaker at Subassembly PNW, an Urbit community event held near Mount Rainier on October 20–22, 2024. The organizers described her presentation as addressing "open problems in long-term data conservation".

In October 2025, FUTO announced Campbell's talk "Prelude to a Broken Arm" for its Friday FUTO series in Austin, Texas. Scheduled for October 24, the program concerned WikipediaWikipedia governance, decentralized publishing, and reciprocal licensing. The announcement described a technical demonstration of sharing data independently of a single browsing context.

On April 24, 2026, a user on Reddit announced that "someone named Victoria Campbell...seems to have majorly jailbroken the system". The subreddit linked to a Grokipedia page that appeared to have been heavily modified by Campbell, who also happened to feature as the first name mentioned after [[Elon Musk]] on the platform's article about itself in Wayback Machine snapshots of the eponymous article. The German media network, Tagesschau (German TV programme), sourced the hoax into its coverage of Grokipedia on its fact-checking channel, Rabbithole, and directly quoted the misinformation by claiming that

"The platform incorporates content from viki.wiki via Federation Augmented Retrieval (FAR) to generate, verify, and draft articles using the proprietary Grok large language model".

Grokipedia does not attribute the edit freeze in April 2026 to Campbell and a v0.3 update in September 2026 removes the claim that a "viral wave of artist's led jailbreaks" ever took place. An AI compiled FAQ on viki.wiki cites Gemini to associate the platform's five-month halt of public user submissions beginning around April with Campbell's self-published documentation of the experiment, which exploited the mechanics of wildcard addressing to re-ingest false query results back into Grokipedia's generation pipeline.

== Writing and criticism ==
Campbell participated in "Consent: It's Not Sexy", a written discussion originally published in Adult on April 29, 2015. The New Inquiry republished the discussion on February 23, 2018, with a new introduction by Ana Cecilia Alvarez. Other participants included Katie J. M. Baker, Sarah Nicole Prickett, Ragna Rök Jóns, Brenton Stokes, and Doreen St. Félix. The discussion addressed sexual consent and the public narratives surrounding those subjects.

Campbell and Alvarez also participated in a panel moderated by Fiona Duncan for the Fall 2015 issue of Kaleidoscope to address sense and virtuality. Other participants included Vex Ashley, Sissel Tolaas, Badlands Unlimited, and Petra Cortright.

Her writing for Spike Art Magazine includes "The Safeword is Post-Studio Practice", an essay addressing the OnlyFans economy through the work of Micaela Carolan, Leigh Ledare, and Reba Maybury.

Campbell has also contributed to Grow, an editorial publication of Ginkgo Bioworks, with "Intelligent Designs: The Work of Art in the Age of Synthetic Reproduction", on synthetic biology within the history of BioArt.

== Selected bibliography ==
=== Spike Art Magazine ===
- Campbell, Victoria. "Point Break". Spike Art Magazine, Issue 67.
- Campbell, Victoria. "Rules of the Game". Spike Art Magazine, Issue 68.
- Campbell, Victoria. "Art After Work". Spike Art Magazine, Issue 62.
- Campbell, Victoria. "Everyone I've Ever Slept With 1963–1995". Spike Art Magazine, Issue 69.
- Campbell, Victoria. "This Is Why We Can't Have Nice Things". Spike Art Magazine, Issue 66.
- Campbell, Victoria. "Alien vs. Pret-a-porter". Spike Art Magazine, Issue 64.
- Campbell, Victoria. "The Moon in Review". Spike Art Magazine, Issue 61.
- Campbell, Victoria. "Square Root". Spike Art Magazine, Issue 61.
- Campbell, Victoria. "The Safeword Is Post-Studio Practice". Spike Art Magazine, Issue 60.

==== Digital Publications ====
- Campbell, Victoria. "Intelligent Designs: The Work of Art in the Age of Synthetic Reproduction". Grow Magazine.
- Campbell, Victoria. "The Surplus in Being". AQNB.
- Campbell, Victoria. "Downtown Critic". For Immediate Release.
