= Natasha Stagg =

American author

Natasha Stagg is a writer and editor who has published four books. She lives in New York City.

== Early life and education ==
Stagg grew up in Tucson, Arizona, until age 14, when her parents divorced. She moved with her mother in 2000 to Grand Rapids, Michigan, and graduated from Forest Hills Northern High School.

Stagg graduated from the University of Michigan in Ann Arbor, where her writing won a Hopwood Award for nonfiction and the Roy W. Cowden Memorial Fellowship. She moved to New York City, and has since attended residencies such as Yaddo and KW Institute in Berlin.

== Writing career ==
=== Books ===
Stagg published her first book, Surveys, in 2016 through Semiotext(e)/Native Agents. The coming of age novel follows 23-year-old Colleen, a mall employee in Tucson, Arizona, who rises to internet fame by blogging about her semi-famous boyfriend and recent move to Los Angeles, California. The protagonist's obsession for a never-ending stream of external validation from online followers as well as the constant grooming of her public relationship with her boyfriend has led many critics to describe the novel as a prescient first-hand account of the rise of the phenomena of social media influencers on Instagram and Twitter.

In 2019, Stagg's second book, titled Sleeveless: Fashion, Image, Media, New York 2011–2019, was published and included a number of essays, criticism, and auto-fiction on publishing, art, and fashion from the 2010s. The book features essays on The Real Housewives of New York City, Abercrombie & Fitch and Marc Jacobs, Alexandra Marzella, Kim Kardashian, Russian-red boots, PR jobs, and fundraising parties.

In 2025, Stagg published Grand Rapids, a coming-of-age novel about a teenage girl in Grand Rapids, Michigan, set in 2001.

=== Other writing ===
In 2020, Stagg wrote about Eduardo "Roth" Neira's eco-friendly architecture firm, Roth Architecture, and its newest project, the SFER IK Museion in Mexico.

Stagg has written for Artforum, V, Playboy, Spike Art Magazine, and n+1. She is the former editor of V Magazine and VMan and her work has been featured in books by Amalia Ulman and Vanessa Place. She frequently writes press releases and exhibition texts for galleries and museums such as 303 Gallery, Almine Rech, Artists Space, Fortmakers, and Renaissance Society.

== Bibliography ==
=== Author ===
- Surveys: A Novel (Semiotext(e) / Native Agents) (2016) ISBN 1584351780
- Sleeveless: Fashion, Image, Media, New York 2011-2019 (Semiotext(e) / Native Agents) (2019) ISBN 1635900964
- Artless: Stories 2019-2023 (Semiotext(e) / Native Agents) (2023) ISBN 1635901901
- Grand Rapids. MIT Press. September 30, 2025. ISBN 978-1-63590-257-0.

=== Essays ===
- "Two Stops." N+1. 2018
- "The Right Time." Gagosian Quarterly. 2020
- "Out of State." Spike Art Magazine. 2021
- "Wrong Turn." The Paris Review. 2023

=== Interviews ===
- "A Conversation with Elizabeth Wurtzel (1967–2020)." N+1. 2020

=== Short stories ===
- "Candy." Mal Journal. 2019
- "Day Shift." Heavy Traffic magazine. 2024
