= Platypus (disambiguation) =

Platypus is the English common name of the Australian egg-laying mammal with the scientific name Ornithorhynchus anatinus.

Platypus may also refer to:

== Biology ==
- Platypus (beetle), a genus of ambrosia beetle in the subfamily Platypodinae of the weevil family Curculionidae
- Platypus, a taxonomic synonym of the orchid genus Eulophia
- Zacco platypus, the pale chub, a freshwater fish indigenous to China

== Music ==
- Platipus Records, a record label
- Platypus (band), a progressive rock / jazz-fusion supergroup
- Platypus, an early name of The Subways, an English indie rock band
- Flobots Present... Platypus, an album
- "Platypus (I Hate You)", a song by Green Day
- "Platypus", a song from the album Disco Volante by the band Mr. Bungle

== Vehicles ==
- HMAS Platypus (1868), the former HMVS Cerberus.
- HMAS Platypus (1917), a submarine depot ship
- HMAS Platypus (naval base), a submarine shore base on Sydney Harbour between 1967 and 1999.
- Platypus (submarine), an 1873 New Zealand submarine
- Schneider ES-65 Platypus, an Australian-designed glider
- a nickname of the Sukhoi Su-34, a Russian fighter-bomber

== Other uses ==
- Accent Group has a chain of around 200 Platypus branded retail stores across Australia and New Zealand.
- Perry the Platypus, a fictional character as featured in Phineas and Ferb
- PLATYPUS, a neutron beam reflectometer
- Platypus (bullion coin), an Australian platinum bullion coin
- Platypus (video game), a horizontal shoot-em-up game and its sequel
- Platypus Affiliated Society, an international educational organization focused on left-wing and Marxist history and thought.
- Platypus Trophy, a trophy awarded to the winner of the Oregon–Oregon State college football game

== See also ==
- Platypus Man, a 1995 American sitcom
