= Bruce High Quality Foundation =

Art collective in Brooklyn, New York

The Bruce High Quality Foundation is an arts collective in Brooklyn, New York City, the United States, which was "created to foster an alternative to everything." The collective is made up of five to eight rotating and anonymous members, most or all of whom are Cooper Union graduates. The group has attracted attention with the subversive, humorous and erudite style of their work and operates an unaccredited art school, the Bruce High Quality Foundation University.

== History and work ==
The collective was formed in 2004. Its members remain anonymous, in protest against the "star-making machinery of the art market", but it is known that they are a group of mostly men and some women, and that some of them met and became friends while studying art at Cooper Union. The group is named after a fictional artist, "Bruce High Quality", who supposedly perished in the 9/11 attack.

In 2005, the Whitney Museum collaborated with Minetta Brook, Robert Smithson's estate, and James Cohan Gallery to sponsor the construction of Robert Smithson's "Floating Island", a floating island of parkland tugged around New York Harbor, inspired by a 1970 drawing by Robert Smithson, entitled "Floating Island to Travel Around Manhattan Island". The island, complete with living trees, was pulled by a tugboat. The Bruce High Quality Foundation responded to the event with their own performance, titled "The Gate: Not the Idea of the Thing but the Thing Itself", in which members of the collective pursued the Smithson island in a small skiff carrying a model of one of the orange gates by Christo and Jeanne-Claude that had been displayed in Central Park earlier that year.

"Public Sculpture Tackle", an ongoing work begun in 2007 and documented on video, features one of the members of the collective, wearing "quasi-football gear", climbing, hurling himself against or hanging from various public sculptures in Manhattan. In the fall of 2007, when Ugo Rondinone displayed a rainbow-coloured sign saying "Hell Yes" on the New Museum, the Bruce High Quality Foundation suspended a similar sign saying "Heaven Forbid" from the building opposite.

The collective's first show in a commercial New York gallery was "The Retrospective" in 2008, employing "an implicitly satiric, reactive style". The collective has produced a film, Isle of the Dead, which was shown in 2009 at the "Plot/09 – This World & Nearer Ones" exhibition organized by Creative Time on Governors Island. A send-up of Night of the Living Dead, the film chronicles the death and zombie-led revival of the art world.

The group's December 2009 show in Miami was curated by Vito Schnabel, son of the artist Julian Schnabel, and attended by New York's rich and famous, guests including the shipping heir Stavros Niarchos III, newsprint billionaire Peter Brant, actor Stephen Dorff and John McEnroe. The Bruce High Quality Foundation was among the artists represented at the 2010 Whitney Biennial.

In 2013, the Bruce High Quality Foundation was the subject of a retrospective at the Brooklyn Museum and exhibited work in Switzerland, Germany. London, Dubai, and Washington. In November 2013 the group opened "Meditations", a single show in two New York galleries. The works duplicated antiquities from the Metropolitan Museum in a Play-Doh-like modeling clay. Later in the month, a silkscreen by the foundation, "Hooverville," depicting the New York skyline with hobos, sold for $425,000 at Sotheby's.

In 2016 Bruce High Quality staged "As We Lay Dying," an immersive multimedia installation including sculpture and performance at The Watermill Center on Long Island, New York.

== The Bruce High Quality Foundation University ==
In July 2009, four members of the group gave a lecture-performance at the Harris Lieberman Gallery in New York that ended with the question: "How can we imagine a sustainable alternative to professionalized art education?" The talk, "How to Explain Pictures to a Dead Bull", mimicked that of Joseph Beuys' 1965 performance, "How to Explain Pictures to a Dead Hare", with the dead bull in the title representing economic recession.

In the fall of 2009 the group would answer its own question by launching an unaccredited art school, the Bruce High Quality Foundation University, where "students are teachers are administrators are staff." A proposition during Prelude 09 took the form of a "project-based" course at the Martin Segal Theater at CUNY Graduate Center and at Performa 09's X Initiative; titled "Art History with Benefits", the lecture-performance promised to examine the romance "figuratively and literally" between cultural funding and sex.

From 2009 to early 2011, the school was based in TriBeCa with courses and student organizations such as "Occult Shenanigans in 20th/21st-Century Art", "What’s a Metaphor?", "The B.H.Q.F.U. Detective Agency" and "Edifying", with the main focus of the curriculum on art history and studio critique. In 2012, the school relocated to 34 Avenue A as a registered 501(c)(3) organization. By 2014, the course offerings included "Math Wipe" by Dmitry Samochine, "Generative Design—Model Assembly" by Sanam Salek, and a class about Japanese art in Japanese language by the curator and educator Nozomi Kato. By 2015, the schools leading participants included David Salle, Brad Troemel, Victoria Campbell, Andrew Norman Wilson, Vito Schnabel, Haley Mellin, Elizabeth Jaeger, Nicole Wittenberg, Ana Cecilia Alvarez and Nathlie Provosty.

As the first and only open-source art school in the United States, BHQFU offered a number of courses taught collaboratively or as a method of collaboration. Campbell and Alvarez' "sex ed" course is mentioned in Sam Thorn's School: A Recent History of Self-Organized Art Education as part of a conversation with BHQFU on the artist-run education platforms that have emerged since 2000. In an exhibition history of the 2014 Brucennial, part of a series of group shows that painter Ray Smith recalls as a "five-day-long party," a member of the collective remarked on the satirical necessity of sex education as part of the industrial reality of the art world. "Women are told that they have to compromise either in their professional lives or their personal lives," BHQF acknowledged. "This puts a psychological toll on women. It prevents them from sharing their fullness with the world.” In 2018, the designer, researcher and artist Caroline Sinders noted Campbell and Alvarez’ "utilitarian, socially minded approach to art-making" as paradigmatic of what Tania Bruguera calls Arte Util in her essay How to make research-driven art.

The Bruce High Quality Foundation University claimed a "broken toilet" was the reason for the school's closure in 2017.

== Reception ==
The Bruce High Quality Foundation has been widely covered in The New York Times. In September 2009, art critic Roberta Smith wrote that the group "has been best known for a sharp, well-aimed and unusually entertaining form of institutional critique." Julia Chaplin, also writing in the New York Times, said in December 2009 that the group was known for its "subversive performance art, humorous videos and conceptual sculptures all infused with Ph.D. quantities of art history references" and had "become the darlings of the art world". In December 2013, Jesse McKinley further explained, "Devoted to the idea that an artwork should stand on its own — without the artist’s identity or biography affecting its worth — the group’s no-name ethos has, perhaps intentionally, proven to be a potent and lucrative creative tool for members and a seductive draw for collectors."

Bruce High Quality Foundation was ranked 99 in ArtReview's guide to the 100 most powerful figures in contemporary art: Power 100, 2010.

Not all reviews of the group's work have been positive. New York Magazine derided the group's anonymous conceit as "pretentious drapery", while judging the show “Meditations” to be “kind of interestingly pretentious".

== Historical perspective ==
The Bruce High Quality Foundation is part of a long history of artists scrutinizing the ever-increasing presence of artist, curator and art institution alike as brands. In the late 1990s, the artist Walid Raad began constructing elaborate fictions chronicling the contemporary history of his native Lebanon, signing his work The Atlas Group and presenting it as a body of collective scholarship. In 2003, Jeff Wassmann launched The Wassmann Foundation, Washington, D.C., representing the fictitious estate of the early Leipzig modernist and sewerage engineer Johann Dieter Wassmann (1841–1898). For over twenty years Banksy has successfully hidden his identity from the general public. In establishing artist and institution as conceits, the projects are free to explore these roles, although the use of pseudonyms in the literary world has a much richer and more established tradition.
