= Wassmann Foundation =

Australian-based foundation

The Wassmann Foundation, Washington, D.C, is an arts collective based in Melbourne, Australia. Founded in 2001, the collective has a rotating membership from a range of fields, including artists, writers, curators, musicians and film-makers. The foundation oversees the estate of the fictitious Leipzig modernist and sewerage engineer Johann Dieter Wassmann (1841–1898). More broadly, it uses its art practice to call into question the growing role of artist, curator and art institution alike, as interconnected and synergetic brands, while exploring the realigned power structures presented by the proliferation of the web.

== History ==
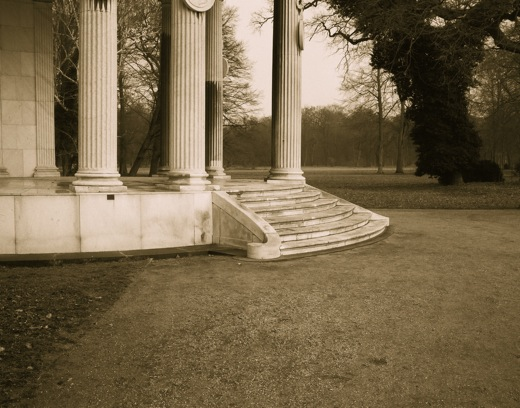
Jeff Wassmann's fictional artist Johann Dieter Wassmann, Freundschaftstempel, Potsdam, 1896. Albumen silver print

The Wassmann Foundation was publicly launched at the Melbourne International Arts Festival in 2003 in an exhibition titled "Bleeding Napoleon." The works of Johann Dieter Wassmann were exhibited by the Wassmann Foundation across three floors of the 19th century Old Melbourne Observatory in a show curated by Kirsten Rann and overseen by Juliana Engberg (curator of the Sydney Biennale 2014). All works were by the American assemblage artist Jeff Wassmann.

The popularity of a website established for the festival gave rise to a range of new media efforts on the part of collective members including blogs, videos, MySpace, Facebook and later Twitter sites. After the United States Department of State withdrew funding from the Venice Biennale's American Pavilion in August 2004, the Wassmann Foundation turned lobbyist, leading an email campaign from "inside the Beltway" to successfully reinstate funding to the Pavilion.

In 2006 Film Victoria provided a funding grant from the Documentary Development program to pursue the project as a film. In the same year it was decided to add photography to the character's talents. Jeff Wassmann has travelled extensively through eastern Germany in the years since, photographing the landscapes and cityscapes in a style recognizable as turn-of-the-century modernist. MuseumZeitraum Leipzig was also created in the same year, ostensibly by a disgruntled employee of the Wassmann Foundation who convinced Leipzig relatives to fight for the repatriation of the character's work to Germany. The foundation agreed to repatriate all assemblage works in November 2007. In its November 1 issue, the art blog ArtInfo announced:

In the first accord of its kind, an American foundation is returning to a German museum works removed from the country. The Washington DC based Wassmann Foundation will turn over to the MuseumZeitraum Leipzig more than 100 19th-century assemblage works by the early modernist Johann Dieter Wassmann (1841–1898) that were taken from storage in Weimar in 1912 without the knowledge or consent of the artist’s Leipzig descendants.

During these years MuseumZeitraum operated a highly popular English-language blog out of Leipzig reporting on contemporary art in eastern Europe.

With Deductible Gift Recipient status from the Australian Taxation Office, the Wassmann Foundation has also financed many outside performance and theater groups.

According to the Foundation's fictional narrative, the key character, Johann Dieter Wassmann, had a number of siblings who were also involved in music and the arts. The work of these further characters was developed by revolving members of the collective.

== Historical perspective ==
The Wassmann Foundation is part of a long history of artists using fictional identities in contemporary art, although the practice has not been as widely accepted as the use of pseudonyms in the literary world, where a much richer and more established tradition has prospered.

Rrose Sélavy was the pseudonym used by the artist Marcel Duchamp in the 1920s. In the late 1990s, the artist Walid Raad began constructing elaborate fictions chronicling the contemporary history of his native Lebanon, signing his work The Atlas Group and presenting it as a body of collective scholarship. In 2004 the Bruce High Quality Foundation, an anonymous artists collective made up of former Cooper Union students, began a highly ambitious practice in New York. In 2013 the Brooklyn Museum showed a retrospective of the collective's work and later in the year a silkscreen by the group, "Hooverville," depicting the New York City skyline with hobos, sold at Sotheby's for $425,000. Banksy is the pseudonym of a Bristol-born graffiti artist and political activist working since the late 1980s. For over thirty years Banksy has successfully hidden his identity from the general public.
