= Federated Wiki =

Wiki software platform

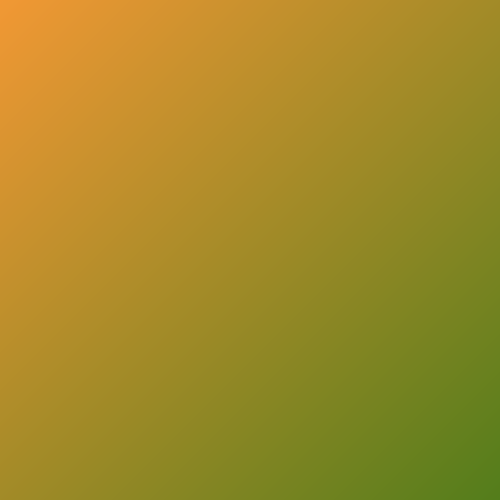

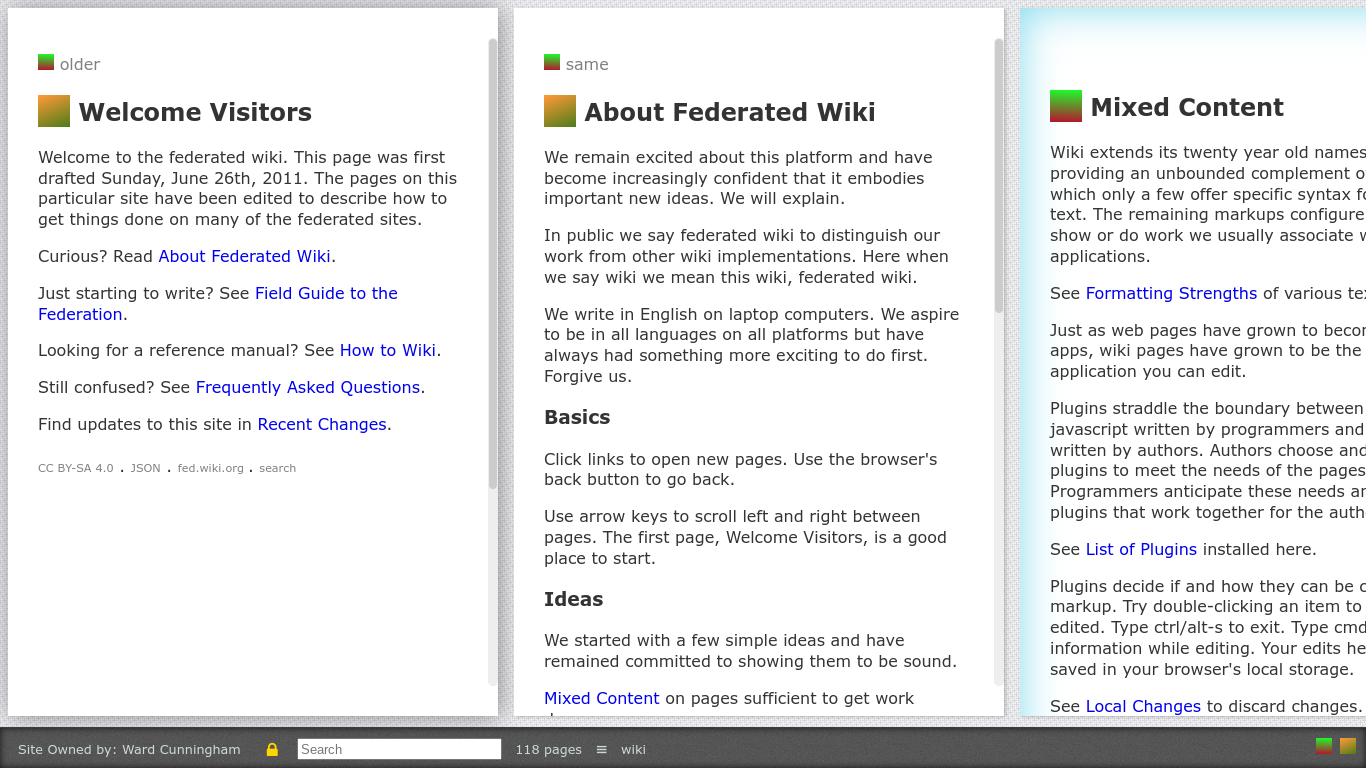
- Official Federated Wiki website running on the namesake application
- Original author: Ward Cunningham
- Developers: Ward Cunningham and GitHub contributors
- Release: December 16, 2013
- Stable release: 0.38.5 / October 19, 2025
- Written in: CoffeeScript
- Type: Wiki software
- License: MIT License
- Website: fed.wiki.org
- Repository: github.com/fedwiki/wiki

Federated Wiki (formerly Smallest Federated Wiki) is a collaborative knowledge application developed by Ward Cunningham which adds forking features found in source control systems and other software development tools to wikis. The project was launched at IndieWebCamp 2011. The software allows its users to fork wiki pages, maintaining their own copies.

Federation supports what Cunningham has described as "a chorus of voices" where users share content but maintain their individual perspectives. This multi-point of view approach contrasts with wikis such as Wikipedia that have a single article for each topic managed by consensus decision-making.

== See also ==
- List of wiki software
- WikiWikiWeb – using Federated Wiki since 2015
