= Ward Cunningham =

American computer programmer (born 1949)

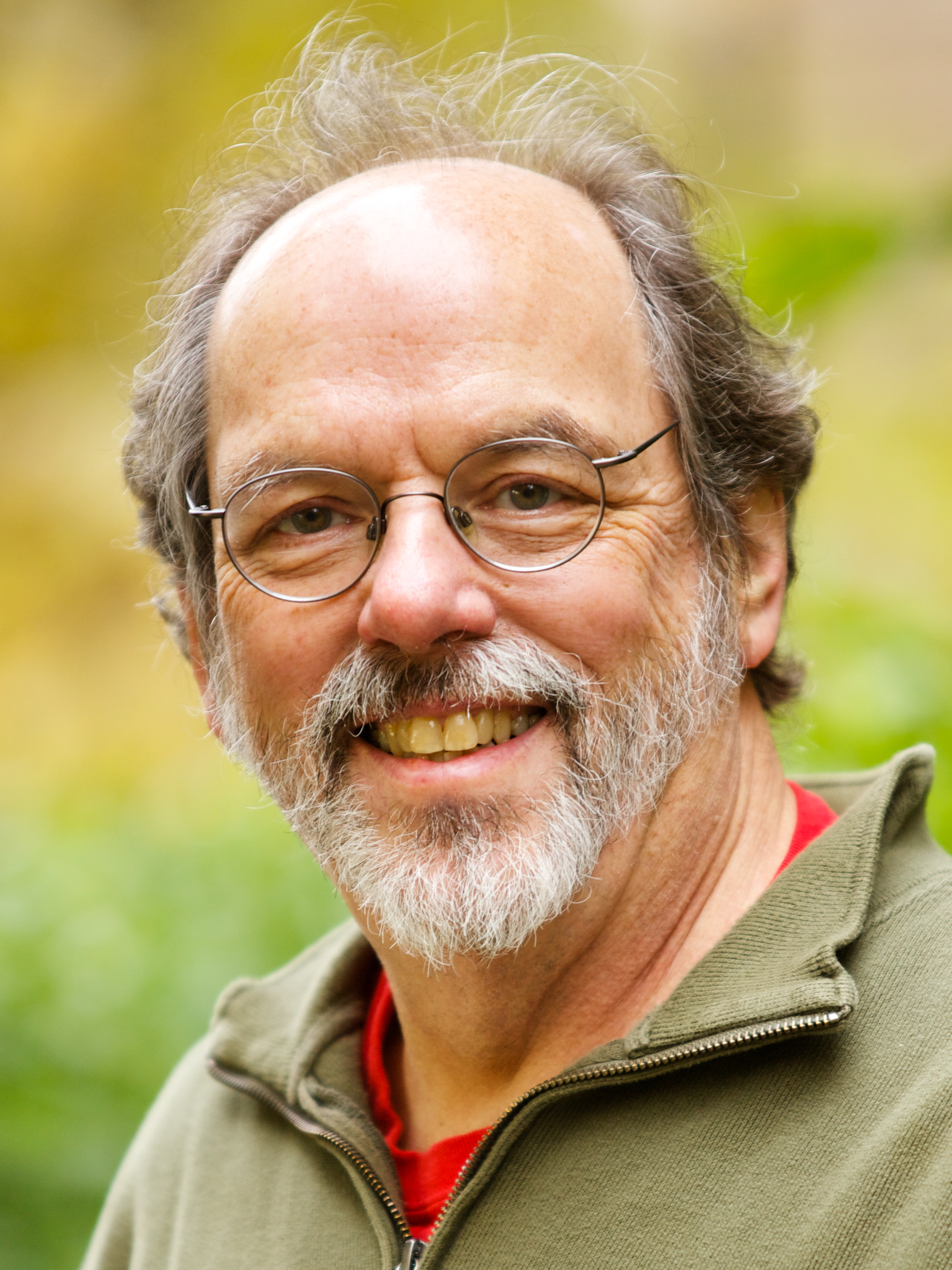
- Cunningham in December 2011
- Born: Howard G. Cunningham; May 26, 1949 (age 77); Michigan City, Indiana, U.S.
- Education: Purdue University
- Occupation: Computer programmer
- Years active: 1984–present
- Known for: WikiWikiWeb, the first implementation of a wiki; Manifesto for Agile Software Development (document)
- Call sign: K9OX

Howard G. Cunningham (born May 26, 1949) is an American computer programmer, who developed the first wiki and co-authored the Manifesto for Agile Software Development. Called a pioneer, and innovator, he also helped create both software design patterns and extreme programming. He began coding the WikiWikiWeb in 1994, and installed it on c2.com (the website of his software consulting firm) on March 25, 1995, as an add-on to the Portland Pattern Repository. He co-authored (with Bo Leuf) a book about wikis, entitled The Wiki Way, and invented the Framework for Integrated Test.

Cunningham was a keynote speaker at the first three instances of the WikiSym conference series on wiki research and practice, and also at the Wikimedia Developer Summit 2017. He was a keynote speaker at the MediaWiki Users and Developers Conference, Spring 2024.

== Early life and career ==
Cunningham was born in Michigan City, Indiana, on May 26, 1949. He grew up in Highland, Indiana, where he completed high school.

Cunningham received his bachelor's degree in interdisciplinary engineering (electrical engineering and computer science) and his master's degree in computer science from Purdue University, graduating in 1978. He is a co-founder of Cunningham & Cunningham, a software consultancy he started with his wife.

Cunningham has also served as Director of R&D at Wyatt Software and as Principal Engineer in the Tektronix Computer Research Laboratory. He is founder of The Hillside Group and has served as program chair of the Pattern Languages of Programming conference which it sponsors.

Cunningham was part of the Smalltalk community.

From December 2003 until October 2005, Cunningham worked for Microsoft in the "Patterns & Practices" group. From October 2005 to May 2007, he held the position of Director of Committer Community Development at the Eclipse Foundation. In May 2009, he joined AboutUs as its chief technology officer. On March 24, 2011 The Oregonian reported that Cunningham had departed AboutUs to join the Venice Beach-based CitizenGlobal, a startup working on crowd-sourced video content, as their chief technology officer and the Co-Creation Czar. He remains "an adviser" with AboutUs. In April 2013, Cunningham left CitizenGlobal to work as a programmer at New Relic.

== Ideas and inventions ==
Cunningham is well known for a few widely disseminated ideas which he originated and developed. The most famous among these are the wiki and many ideas in the field of software design patterns, made popular by the Gang of Four (GoF). He owns the company Cunningham & Cunningham Inc., a consultancy that has specialized in object-oriented programming. He coined the concept of technical debt and expanded on the idea in 1992. He created the site (and software) WikiWikiWeb, the first internet wiki, in 1995.

In 2001, he signed the Manifesto for Agile Software Development as a co-author.

When asked in a 2006 interview with internetnews.com whether he considered patenting the wiki concept, he explained that he thought the idea "just sounded like something that no one would want to pay money for."

Cunningham during an interview in 2011

Cunningham is interested in tracking the number and location of wiki page edits as a sociological experiment and may even consider the degradation of a wiki page as part of its process to stability. "There are those who give and those who take. You can tell by reading what they write."

In 2011, Cunningham created Smallest Federated Wiki, a tool for wiki federation, which applies aspects of software development such as forking to wiki pages. The Federated Wiki has since been taken up by a younger generation of developers, such as Victoria Campbell and David Bovilli, working to decentralize new media and contemporary art infrastructure, by nature collaborative.

Cunningham has contributed to the practice of object-oriented programming, in particular the use of pattern languages and (with Kent Beck) the class-responsibility-collaboration cards. He also contributes to the Extreme programming software development methodology. Much of this work was done collaboratively on the first wiki site.

=== "Cunningham's Law" ===
Cunningham is credited with the idea: "The best way to get the right answer on the Internet is not to ask a question; it's to post the wrong answer." This refers to the observation that people are quicker to correct a wrong answer than to answer an unanswered question. According to Steven McGeady, Cunningham advised him of this on a whim in the early 1980s, and McGeady dubbed this Cunningham's Law. Although originally referring to interactions on Usenet, the law has been used to describe how other online communities work, such as Wikipedia. Cunningham relativises his ownership of the law, calling it a "misquote that disproves itself by propagating through the internet" and by saying that he "never suggested asking questions by posting wrong answers".

== Personal life ==
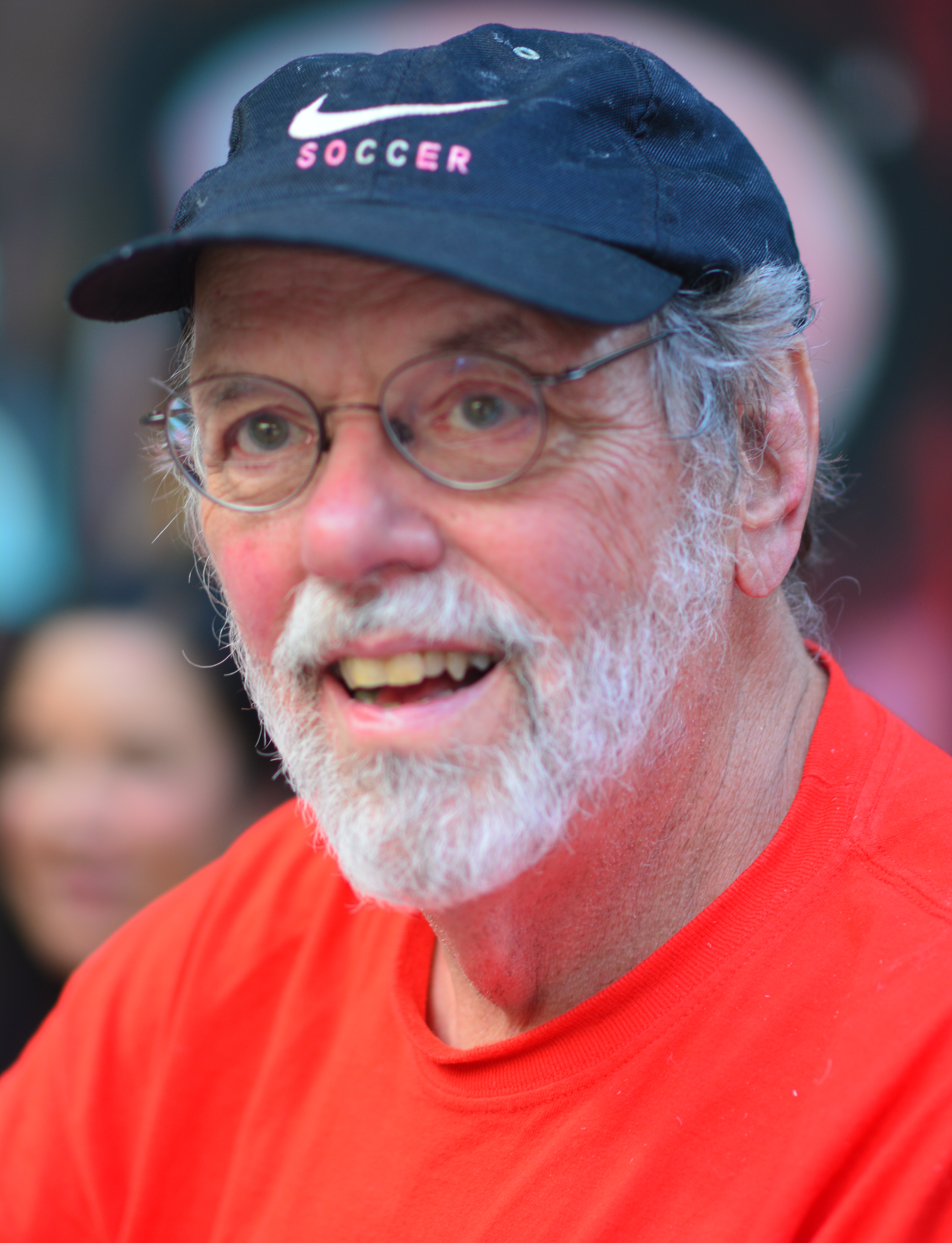
Cunningham in 2023

Cunningham lives in Beaverton, Oregon. He holds an amateur radio Extra class license. His call sign is K9OX.

Cunningham is Nike's first "Code for a Better World" Fellow.

== Publications ==
- Leuf, Bo; Cunningham, Ward (2001). The Wiki Way. Addison-Wesley Professional. ISBN 978-0201714999.

== See also ==
- Christopher Alexander – Cunningham cites Alexander's work as directly influencing his own
