= Wikis and education =

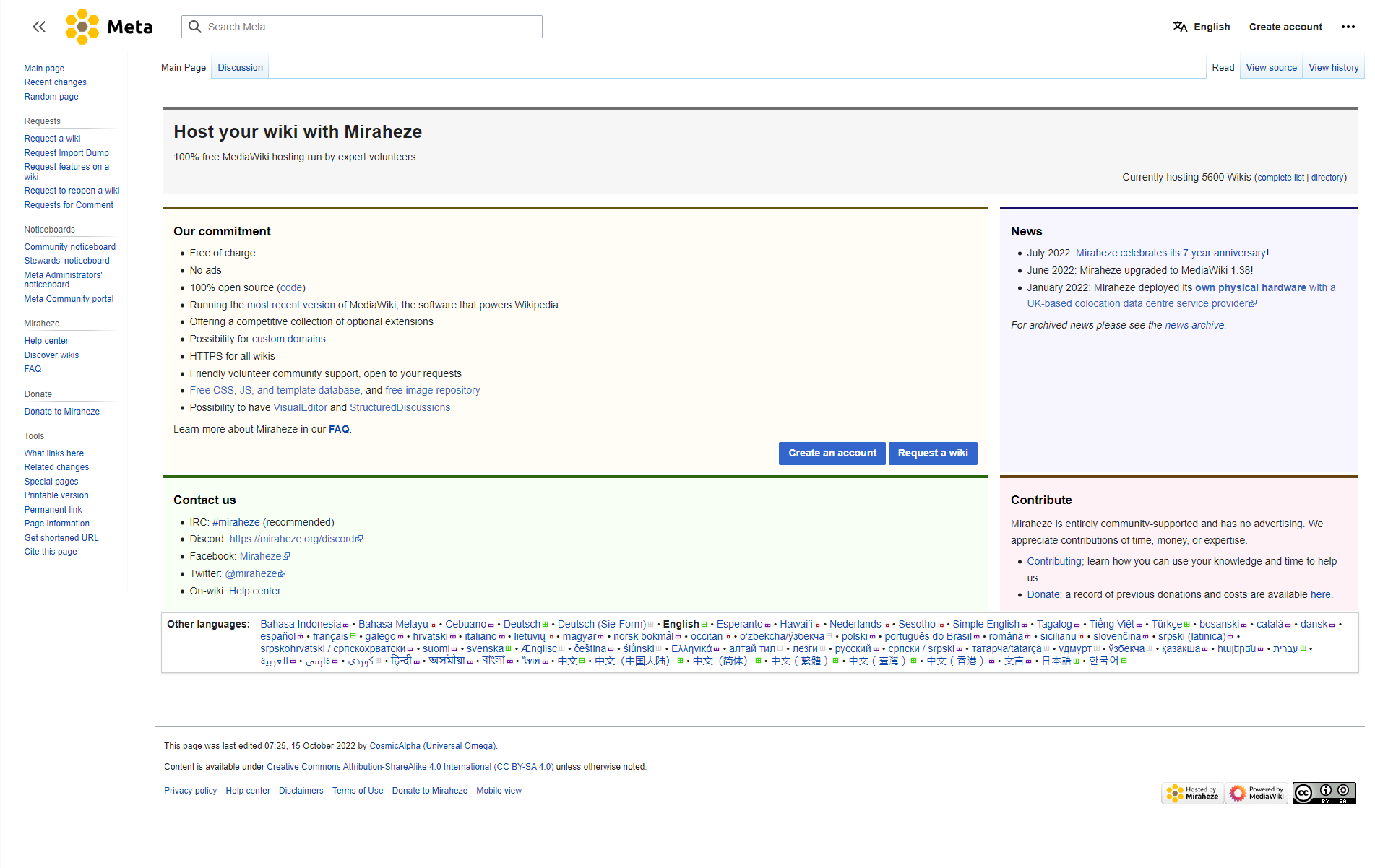
Miraheze, a free software wiki hosting service used by in open educational practices.

Wikis are a Web 2.0 technology where users can edit or add content onto a web page with a web browser, and are thought to facilitate collaboration by promoting interaction with online content. Many publicly available wikis, such as Wikiversity, allow for self-education, and wikis are sometimes used in classrooms for collaborative projects.

Some teachers have found, however, that learners prefer to add their own content rather than rewrite others' work, perhaps because of an institutionally cultivated norm of individual ownership. Some students express shyness about exposing their work to be viewed by others. Such transparency seems to reduce plagiarism.

There is capability, with wiki software such as MediaWiki, to review all the edits made by any particular user. In this way, if an edit made by a user is identified as problematic, it is possible to check that user's other edits for issues. This feature is useful for teachers of classes in which grades for group projects are determined by the contributions of individual students to a wiki. One teacher notes, "Since all the work is done on the wiki, the teacher can see everything that is and is not being done. That makes early intervention possible whenever it is necessary." Another educator who had students use MediaWiki writes:

One thing they didn’t have to worry about—and herein lies, to my mind, one of the greatest virtues of the wiki as a tool for collaborative work—was that some contributors might walk away with a high grade in exchange for little effort, freeloading off the commitment of others. I showed them how the wiki enabled me—and them—to track each user’s participation in the project. In the end, a student whose contribution amounted to a few brief, marginal paragraphs earned a C− for the assignment, while two students who contributed a large quantity of excellent material earned a grade of A+. Other grades ranged from B− to A.
