= The Wiki Way =

2001 work by Bo Leuf and Ward Cunningham

- Author: Bo Leuf; Ward Cunningham
- Publisher: Addison-Wesley
- Publication date: April 3, 2001
- ISBN: 0-201-71499-X

The Wiki Way: Quick Collaboration on the Web is a 2001 book about wikis by Bo Leuf and Ward Cunningham.

It was the first major book published about using wikis. Cunningham invented wikis when he wrote WikiWikiWeb, the first wiki website software.

The book is about how to manage wiki systems, followed by a perspective on the nature of wiki-style online communication.

== Reception ==
Eugene Eric Kim wrote in Web Techniques that "Leuf and Cunningham do a good job of explaining what a Wiki is" and said "The Wiki Way is about the way we work, and that makes it a worthwhile read." David Mattison of Searcher tried the book's QuickiWiki script. Simon Worthington stated, "The Wiki Way book is a manifesto and a software manual in one, with the essentials for Wiki installation attached on CD."
