= Bo Leuf =

Swedish politician and writer (1952–2009)

Bo Leuf

Bo Arne Leuf (July 9, 1952 – April 24, 2009) was co-author of the book The Wiki Way (2001), written in collaboration with wiki inventor Ward Cunningham. His book Peer To Peer (2002) discusses different peer-to-peer (P2P) solutions both from a technical and legal point of view.

Bo Leuf lived in Gothenburg, Sweden. He was a candidate for the Pirate Party in the Swedish general election in 2006 and was also on its board as treasurer.

In 1971, he came from Västernorrland to Gothenburg to study engineering physics at Chalmers University.

In 1979, he opened a book shop called Wizard in Gothenburg. Later, when he moved to Malmö in 1992, he opened a new shop, this time under the name of Daggshimmer. At this time in Malmö, he also helped his wife and mother-in-law to run the Demaret's School of Languages, a former Berlitz language school still using the same teaching method. He got married on June 2, 1984 and had two children. He died of cancer on April 24, 2009.

== Publications ==
- Bo Leuf, Ward Cunningham, The Wiki Way: Quick Collaboration on the Web, Addison-Wesley (April, 2001) ISBN 0-201-71499-X
- Bo Leuf, Outlook in a Nutshell: A Power User's Quick Reference, ISBN 1-56592-704-4
- Bo Leuf, Peer to Peer: Collaborating and Sharing over the Internet, ISBN 0-201-76732-5
- Bo Leuf, The Semantic Web: Crafting Infrastructure for Agency, John Wiley & Sons, 2006, ISBN 0-470-01522-5
