= Spike Art Magazine =

- Editor: Rita Vitorelli
- Categories: art magazines
- Frequency: Quarterly
- Founder: Rita Vitorelli
- Founded: 2004
- Based in: Vienna, Berlin
- Language: English
- Website: www.spikeartmagazine.com/en

Spike Art Magazine or simply Spike, is a contemporary art magazine published in print four times a year with new content published online weekly. Spike was founded in Vienna, Austria in 2004 by artist Rita Vitorelli.

In 2014, along with the redesign by Mirko Borsche, Spike opened a second editorial office and a non-commercial art space in Berlin where it now hosts regular events, including their round-table discussions, as well as lectures, talks and performances. Their offices in Berlin are located opposite the Volksbühne on Rosa-Luxemburg-Platz in Mitte.

The magazine has had contributions from the following art critics: Karen Archey, Dean Kissick, Victoria Campbell, Pablo León de la Barra, Alison M. Gingeras, Bruce Hainley and Hans-Ulrich Obrist.
