= FUTO =

FUTO or futo can refer to:

- Federal University of Technology Owerri, public university in Owerri, Nigeria
- Gyula Futó, Hungarian footballer (1908–1977)
- Shibaura-futō Station, railway station in Tokyo, Japan
- Futo Station, railway station in Itō, Shizuoka Prefecture, Japan
