= Platypus Affiliated Society =

Marxist campus organization

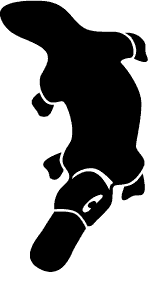
- Established: December 2006; 19 years ago
- Founder: Chris Cutrone
- Founded at: School of the Art Institute of Chicago; University of Chicago
- Publication: The Platypus Review; Die Platypus Review (German)
- Website: platypus1917.org

The Platypus Affiliated Society (alternatively Platypus or PAS) is an international educational organization focused on left-wing and Marxist history and thought. Platypus organizes reading groups, forums, and research and journalism, focused on the inherited problems of what it terms the Old, New, and post-political left. It was founded by Chris Cutrone and his students at the School of the Art Institute of Chicago in 2006, and describes itself as "hosting the conversation on the left" to "dissolve ideological obstacles to the reestablishment of socialism." As of 2025 it reports around 50 chapters, principally in North America, Europe, and Oceania and usually based on university campuses.

== Theory ==
=== The "Platypus Synthesis" ===
Dr. Shtefan Alexander has characterized Platypus's ideological approach to Marxism as a "via negativa," challenging the left with what it lacks or has abandoned and raising the history of Marxism as "a question to our contemporary society about the possibility of radically transforming our social relations."

In reading groups organized by PAS, Marx is considered as an interlocutor with "radical bourgeois philosophy," especially thinkers such as Jean-Jacques Rousseau, Adam Smith, Immanuel Kant, and Georg Wilhelm Friedrich Hegel. Marx and Marxism are understood as a dialectical continuation of this Enlightenment tradition, critiquing the way it becomes self-contradictory in industrial capitalism. To engage with the history of Marxist politics, Platypus reads texts from the radical Marxists of the Second International—namely Vladimir Lenin, Rosa Luxemburg, and Leon Trotsky—as representing a high point of Marxism's emancipatory potential. In the wake of the Russian Revolution, the historiography and political claims of the Second International are considered in light of Karl Korsch's Marxism and Philosophy (1923) and György Lukács's History and Class Consciousness (1923), both foundational texts for the critical theory of the Frankfurt School which was founded soon after.

As part of the "via negativa," Platypus identifies key thinkers in the milieu of the Frankfurt School, such as Theodor Adorno, Max Horkheimer, and Walter Benjamin, as preserving important elements of Marxian theory after defeats and failures of Marxist politics. Trotsky's discussion of the crisis of Marxism in the 1930s represents for Platypus an analogous attempt to preserve the radical, critical character of Marxism's political practice. Platypus argues that although these traditions failed in their respective projects, they still sought by different means to preserve elements of Marxism's critical method and therefore serve as negative object lessons for any attempt to recover Marxist theory in the present.

=== Historical Regression ===
Platypus maintains that the history of the twentieth century was a history of regression in consciousness, wherein the left repeatedly missed opportunities for ideological clarification by inverting failures and defeats into victories. Platypus takes this historical regression as the occasion for its project. Platypus identifies four key periods around which it argues the left has regressed by abandoning the radical horizons of Marxism:

- 1917 – The Russian Revolution. Platypus argues that the singular advance brought by the Russian Revolution was opportunity to further clarify the tasks of Marxism. However, especially following the failure of the world revolution to spread to European countries such as Germany and Hungary, this priority has been obscured or abandoned.
- 1933 – The inaugurations of Franklin D. Roosevelt as U.S. President and of Adolf Hitler as German chancellor. During the 1930s, the left largely coalesced behind the Comintern policy of the popular front, supporting Stalinism and progressivism against the rise of fascism. This reorientation marked the disintegration of the left's commitment to the "utopian possibilities" of capitalism which only Marxism could realize, contrary to realist or merely oppositional politics.
- 1968 – Mass protest movements. The wave of protests around the world in 1968 failed to escape the horizons of capitalist politics. Student movements resisted urges from, e.g., Theodor Adorno of the need for the theoretical reflection and clarification potentially at the expense of immediate political practice. The period has instead been hailed as indicative of the success of popular action, thus failing to examine underlying deficiencies such as an implicit conservatism or authoritarianism.
- 2001 – Anti-war movements. Much of the international left was involved in the anti-war movement after the September 11 terror attacks. Platypus argued that, in addition to the previous moments of defeat, the left failed to heed lessons from the 1979 Iranian Revolution, the collapse of the Soviet Union, and the anti-globalization movement of the 1990s in which the left supported conservative-reactionary forces. As a consequence, many sections of the left, due to an uncritical embrace of anti-imperialism, avoided deeper historical problems around the need for an independent, socialist politics internationally.

=== Namesake ===
The organization's name alludes to Friedrich Engels's disbelief at the existence of the platypus, which the organization likens to the current state of the left. They argue that, similarly to how preceding extinction events made the platypus difficult to taxonomize, the contemporary left may only be properly justified as a left on the basis of a presently-buried history. PAS's slogan, "The Left is dead! Long live the Left!", similarly expresses this prognosis, that "the Platypus symbolizes the need for intellectual flexibility, humility, and openness to new ideas in the left’s ideological framework."

== History ==
Platypus was initially conceived in December 2004 as a journal project, organized by a group of students at the University of Chicago studying under Neo-Marxist historian and social theorist Moishe Postone. In 2006, Platypus organized a reading group on the history of Marxist critical theory, and in January 2007 hosted its first public forum. These activities, in addition to coffee breaks, came to comprise the "tripod" of Platypus. PAS has hosted public panel discussions since 2007. These discussions have featured panelists such as Norman Finkelstein, Adolph Reed Jr. and Bhaskar Sunkara, and have covered topics such as the political party, the labor movement, the Iranian Revolution, free speech, and anti-racism, as well as the legacy of the Anti-Germans in Germany. Platypus has hosted a yearly international convention in Chicago since 2009.

== Publishing ==
=== Platypus Review ===
The Platypus Review is a monthly, open-submission journal first published by the organization in November 2007. The Review is self-described as "a forum among a variety of tendencies and approaches on the Left […] [intending] to provoke disagreement and to open shared goals as sites of contestation." It has published notable thinkers on the left including Angela Davis, Grover Furr, David Harvey, Gerald Horne, Axel Honneth, Domenico Losurdo, Nina Power, Mark Rudd, and Slavoj Zizek. The Review also publishes articles written by students.

A German-language sister publication, Die Platypus Review, began serialization in April 2016.

=== Books ===
The Platypus Affiliated Society publishes anthologies of articles from the Platypus Review through Platypus Publishing.

- ''The Platypus Review Reader, Volume 1'' (2015). Platypus Publishing LLC. ISBN 978-0-9962061-1-2.
- ''Marxism in the Age of Trump'' (2018). Platypus Publishing LLC. ISBN 978-0-9962061-3-6.
- ''The Platypus Review Reader, Volume 2'' (2024). Platypus Publishing LLC. ISBN 978-0-9962061-5-0.

== Criticism ==
The Platypus Affiliated Society has been criticized for a variety of alleged political positions, while Platypus maintains that it is a "pre-political" organization with no political line. Mike Macnair of the Weekly Worker has criticized Platypus as inadequate to its own theoretical project of a critique of the left and having implicit political positions about Second International Marxism and the impossibility of leftist politics today.

Platypus has described anti-Trumpism on the left as "nervous hyperventilation of the complacent status quo under threat." Correspondingly, critics have accused Platypus and its membership of supporting Trumpism. Platypus's founder, Chris Cutrone, was criticized after publishing an article challenging the left's opposition to President Donald Trump's proposed acquisition of Greenland with Jonathan Chait characterizing Cutrone as a "horseshoe-theory Marxist." Platypus has also been alleged to ideologically support imperialism or United States military intervention, claims which Platypus has denied, citing the actual positions of organizations such as the Iraqi Communist Party during the American occupation of Iraq.

In late 2013, a number of the Platypus Affiliated Society's internal communications were leaked, including reports from then-president Chris Cutrone characterizing Platypus as "a combat organization waging war on the 'Left'" and, separately, comments remarking on the prospects for Palestinians in the Israel-Palestine conflict. Following these leaks, former Platypus member Ben Campbell wrote an open letter calling for a boycott of all participation on events and activities hosted by the organization; the letter was subsequently published by left-wing commentator Richard Seymour. The letter had eighteen additional signatories, including Sebastian Budgen, editor of Historical Materialism; political theorist Jodi Dean; Doug Henwood of Left Business Observer; and philosopher Nina Power. Power no longer supports the boycott, stating she had "no idea why I signed it in the first place."
