= Comparison of wiki software =

Software to run a collaborative wiki compared

The following tables compare general and technical information for many wiki software packages.

== General information ==
Systems listed on a light purple background are no longer in active development.

Wiki software	Creator	First public release date	Latest stable release	Stable release date	Predecessor	Software license	Open source	Multilingual	Programming language	Data backend
BlueSpice	Hallo Welt! GmbH	31 March 2011	5.2	2026-01-22[±]	MediaWiki	GPLv3	Yes	Yes	PHP	MariaDB, MySQL
BookStack	Dan Brown	12 July 2015	26.09.2	2026-10-20; 20 days ago		MIT	Yes	Yes	PHP	MariaDB, MySQL
Central Desktop	Central Desktop Inc.	1 October 2005	2.0	22 February 2010		Proprietary	No		PHP	PostgreSQL
CLiki2	Andrey Moskvitin, Vladimir Sedach, Anastasiya Sterh	30 November 2003	0.4.4	28 May 2005	CLiki	AGPL v3	Yes		Common Lisp	
Confluence	Atlassian	25 March 2004	10.2.18	8 September 2026; 2 months ago		Proprietary	No	Yes	Java, Java EE	MS SQL Server, MySQL, Oracle, or PostgreSQL
ConnectedText	Eduardo Mauro	2005	6.0.15	26 June 2015		Proprietary	No	Yes	C++	SQL
DokuWiki	Andreas Gohr	July 2004	2026-07-14c	2026-09-02; 24 months ago		GPL v2	Yes	Yes	PHP	File system
FlexWiki	David Ornstein	September 2004	2.1.0.274	20 October 2008		CPL	Yes		ASP.NET, C#	File system, Microsoft SQL Server
Foswiki	Foswiki community	December 2008	2.1.11	2026-03-15[±]	TWiki	GPL	Yes	Yes	Perl	Flat-file database, RCS, or a variety of databases as plugins
Gollum	Tom Preston-Werner, Rick Olson, Dawa Ometto, Bart Kamphorst, and community	16 February 2009	6.1.0	2024-12-23; 22 months ago		MIT	Yes	Yes	Ruby	Git
IBM Connections	IBM	27 June 2007	6 CR5	2019-05-30[±]		Proprietary	No	Yes	Java, Java EE	IBM Db2, MS SQL Server, or Oracle
Ikiwiki	Joey Hess et al.	29 April 2006	3.20260201	2026-02-01[±]		GNU General Public License v2 +	Yes	Yes	Perl	standard version control system such as Git or Subversion or 6+ others
Jive	Jive Software	7 January 2007	9.0.7.1	2019-03-20[±]		Proprietary	No	Yes	Java EE, Java	SQL, LDAP
JotSpot	JotSpot (now Google Sites)	October 2004	2.0	24 July 2006		Proprietary	No		Java	File system, XML
MediaWiki	Magnus Manske, then Lee Daniel Crocker	25 January 2002	1.46.1	1 October 2026; 39 days ago	UseModWiki	GPL v2	Yes	Yes	PHP	MySQL, MariaDB, PostgreSQL, SQLite
Midgard Wiki	Henri Bergius	29 September 2004	10.05.6	6 March 2012		LGPL	Yes		PHP	MySQL and RCS
MindTouch	MindTouch Inc.	25 July 2006	10.1.4	22 January 2013	MediaWiki	Proprietary	No	Yes	PHP, C# on Windows or Mono	MySQL
MoinMoin	Jürgen Hermann, Thomas Waldmann, others	28 July 2000	1.9.11	8 November 2020; 6 years ago	PikiPiki	GPL	Yes	Yes	Python	Flat-file database
MojoMojo	Marcus Ramberg & community	29 August 2007	1.12	13 May 2017		?	Yes	Yes	Perl	PostgreSQL, SQLite, MySQL, others
MyInfo	Milenix Software Ltd.	October 1999	7.1	25 May 2021		Proprietary	No	Yes	C++	
Notion	Notion Labs Inc.	2016	2.0.41	2023-02-28		Proprietary				
Obsidian	Dynalist Inc.	30 March 2020	1.3.5	2023-06-01		Proprietary	No	Yes	JavaScript	Markdown, File system
PBworks	David Weekly	30 May 2005			TipiWiki	Proprietary	No		PHP	MogileFS, Squid, MySQL, Pound, lighttpd
PhpWiki	Steve Wainstead, Reini Urban, Marc-Etienne Vargenau, others	December 1999	1.6.6	5 May 2025	WikiWikiWeb	GPL	Yes	Yes	PHP	Flat-file database, MySQL, PostgreSQL, Oracle, SQLite
PmWiki	Patrick Michaud	8 January 2002	2.7.8	2026-10-24[±]		GPL	Yes	Yes	PHP	Flat-file database. SQLite (plug-in)
PukiWiki	Yuji Oda, then Puki Development Team	15 July 2002	1.5.4	30 March 2022; 4 years ago	YukiWiki	GPL v2	Yes	Yes	PHP	Flat-file
SharePoint	Microsoft	March 2001	16.0.19725.20280	2026-5-12		Proprietary	No	Yes	ASP.NET, C#	Microsoft SQL Server or Windows Internal Database
Semantic MediaWiki	Markus Krötzsch, Denny Vrandečić and others	2005	7.4.0	2 November 2026; 7 days ago		GPL v2	Yes	Yes	PHP	MySQL, MariaDB, PostgreSQL, SQLite and several Triplestores
Socialtext	Socialtext	2003	7.5	2015		Dual (CPAL) and Proprietary)			Perl	PostgreSQL
Swiki	Mark Guzdial; Jochen Rick	October 1999	1.5	6 December 2005		GPL	Yes		Squeak	File system
TiddlyWiki	Jeremy Ruston	September 2004	5.4.0	2026-04-20; 6 months ago		BSD	Yes	Yes	Wikitext, JavaScript	HTML file
Tiki Wiki CMS Groupware	Luis Argerich (200+ devs nowadays)	9 October 2002	27.1	2024-11-23; 23 months ago		LGPL	Yes	Yes	PHP	MariaDB, MySQL
Trac	Edgewall Software	1 October 2006	1.4.3	9 May 2021		BSD	Yes	Yes	Python	MariaDB, MySQL, PostgreSQL, SQLite
Traction TeamPage	Traction Software	1 December 1999	7.0 (23)	2025-11-30[±]		Proprietary	No	Supports multi-lingual content (and supports i18n)	Java SE, Java	Flat file and file system, Oracle 10G RDB option, WebDAV for attachments
TWiki	Peter Thoeny	October 1998	6.1.0	2018-07-16[±]	JosWiki	GPL	Yes	Yes	Perl	Flat-file database, RCS, pluggable storage backend
UseModWiki	Clifford Adams	11 October 1999	1.2.3	16 August 2025	AtisWiki	GPL	Yes		Perl	Flat-file database
Whizfolders	AvniTech	1999	7.1	9 June 2016		Proprietary	No		Delphi	File system
Wiki.js	Nicolas Giard	28 January 2017	3.2.0	2026-11-08; 26 hours ago		Affero GPL v3	Yes	Yes	JavaScript	PostgreSQL, MySQL, MariaDB, Microsoft SQL Server, or SQLite
Wiki Server	Apple Inc.	26 October 2007	5.6.3	2018-09-18		Proprietary	No	Yes	Ruby on Rails	PostgreSQL
Wikispaces	Tangient LLC	18 March 2005				Proprietary	No	Yes	PHP	MySQL, MogileFS
WikiWikiWeb	Ward Cunningham	1995			WikiWikiHyperCard	?			Perl	File system
XWiki	Ludovic Dubost	February 2004	18.9.0	2026-10-26[±]		LGPL	Yes	Yes	Java	HSQLDB, MariaDB, MySQL, Oracle, PostgreSQL
Zim	Jaap Karssenberg	10 January 2010	0.77.2	2026-07-26; 3 months ago		GPL	Yes	Yes	Python	File system
Wiki software	Creator	First public release date	Latest stable release	Stable release date	Predecessor	Software license	Open source	Multilingual	Programming language	Data backend

== Target audience ==
Wiki software	Public	Private	Corporate, enterprise	Education	Intranet	Personal	Scientific, technical, mathematical
BlueSpice	Yes	Yes	Yes	Yes	Yes	No	Support for LaTeX math; syntax highlighting
BookStack	Yes	Yes	Yes	Yes	Yes	Yes	Partial
Central Desktop	Yes	Yes	Yes	Yes	Yes		
Confluence	Yes	Yes	Yes	Yes	Yes	Yes	
ConnectedText		Yes				Yes	Mathematical formulas rendered using LaTeX, directed acyclic graphs rendered with GraphViz
DokuWiki	Yes	Yes	Yes	Yes	Yes	Yes	Support for LaTeX math; syntax highlighting via plugins
FlexWiki	Yes	Yes	Yes				
Foswiki	Yes	Yes	Yes	Yes	Yes	Yes	LaTeX & math plugins; full HTML, JavaScript support
Gitit	Yes	Yes	Yes	Yes	Yes	Yes	Built-in support for LaTeX math; syntax highlighting for code blocks.
Gollum	Yes	Yes	Yes	Yes	Yes	Yes	Built-in support for MathML and LaTeX math; syntax highlighting for code blocks; citations; annotations
IBM Connections	Yes	Yes	Yes	Yes	Yes	Yes	Yes
Jive	Yes	Yes	Yes	Yes	Yes	No	
JotSpot	Yes	Yes	Yes				
MediaWiki	Yes	Yes	Yes	Yes	Yes	Yes	Built-in support for LaTeX math; syntax highlighting for code blocks; full HTML, JavaScript support
Midgard Wiki	Yes	Yes	Yes				
MindTouch	Yes	Yes	Yes	Yes	Yes		
MoinMoin	Yes	Yes	Yes	Yes	Yes	Yes	LaTeX math input via plugin in ParserMarket
MojoMojo	Yes	Yes	Yes	Yes	Yes	Yes	
MyInfo		Yes	Yes	Yes		Yes	
Notion	Yes	Yes	Yes	Yes		Yes	
Obsidian	Yes	Yes	Yes	Yes	Yes	Yes	Support for LaTeX, code blocks, plugins
PBworks	Yes	Yes	Yes	Yes	Yes		
PhpWiki	Yes	Yes	Yes	Yes	Yes		Support for LaTeX through a plugin
PmWiki	Yes	Yes	Yes	Yes	Yes	Yes	LaTeX–MathML formulas (addons), Mind maps (addon), HTML (addon), syntax highlighting (addons), embed videos/maps (addons)
SamePage	Yes	Yes	Yes	Yes	Yes		
SharePoint Foundation			Yes	Yes			
SharePoint Server	Yes	Yes	Yes	Yes	Yes	Yes	Yes
Semantic MediaWiki	Yes	Yes	Yes	Yes	Yes	Yes	Built-in support for RDF, Semantic Web standards and LaTeX math; syntax highlighting for code blocks; full HTML, JavaScript support
Socialtext	Yes	Yes	Yes	Yes	Yes		
Swiki	Yes	Yes		Yes			
TiddlyWiki		Yes				Yes	Support for syntax highlighting, embedding images and videos, native JavaScript, LaTeX (using KaTeX plugin) and other plugins
Tiki Wiki CMS Groupware	Yes	Yes	Yes	Yes	Yes	Yes	Support for LaTeX math; syntax highlighting
Trac	Yes	Yes	Yes	Yes	Yes	Yes	Many plugins available for formulas, graphs, etc.
Traction TeamPage	Yes	Yes	Yes	Yes	Yes		
TWiki	Yes	Yes	Yes	Yes	Yes	Yes	LaTeX & math plugins; full HTML, JavaScript support
UseModWiki	Yes	Yes	Yes	Yes	Yes		
Whizfolders		Yes	Yes	Yes		Yes	Pictures and Windows RTF features
Wiki.js	Yes	Yes	Yes	Yes	Yes	Yes	Syntax highlighting for code blocks; GitHub-flavored Markdown syntax; full HTML; images, videos, documents
Wikispaces	Yes	Yes	Yes	Yes	Yes	Yes	
XWiki	Yes	Yes	Yes	Yes	Yes	Yes	Yes
Zim	Yes	Yes	Yes	Yes	Yes		
Wiki software	Public	Private	Corporate, enterprise	Education	Intranet	Personal	Scientific, technical, mathematical

== Features 1 ==
Wiki software	File uploading, attachments	Spam prevention	Page access control	Inline HTML	User-customizable interface	Document renaming
BlueSpice	Yes	Yes	Yes	Yes	Yes, templates and themes, html and css	Yes
BookStack	Yes	Yes	Yes	Yes	Partial, CSS	Yes
Central Desktop	Yes	Yes, CAPTCHA	No	Yes	Yes, templates and themes, html and css	No
ConnectedText	No	No	No	Yes	Yes, templates and themes + CSS	Yes, links to renamed document are also renamed
Confluence	Yes	Yes, CAPTCHA	Yes	Optional	Yes, templates and themes + CSS	Yes, links are updated
DokuWiki	Yes	Yes, blacklist	Yes, optional	Yes, optional	Yes, templates, CSS, PHP; heavily documented PHP API	Yes, plugin
FlexWiki	Yes	Yes, blacklist, CAPTCHA, nofollow	Yes	Yes, plugin	Partial: CSS, templates, WikiTalk	Yes, old page becomes a redirect
Foswiki	Yes	Yes	Yes	Yes	templates, skins, user CSS	Yes, fixing backlinks
Gitit	Yes	Yes, reCAPTCHA	Yes	Yes	Yes: templates, CSS	Yes, old page becomes a redirect
Gollum	Yes	No	Partial: can disable editing, further control customizable via Rack	Yes	Yes, templates and themes, html and css	Yes, old page becomes a redirect
IBM Connections	Yes	Yes, only in private modus	No, not default	Yes	Yes: templates, CSS, and/or product modification	Yes
Jive	Yes	Optional	Yes, extensive permissions API	Yes	Yes	No, scheduled for 3.0
JotSpot	Yes	No	Yes	Yes, optional	Partial: CSS	Yes
MediaWiki	Yes	Yes, URL blacklist, word blacklist, IP address blocking, CAPTCHAs	Partial: very limited read access control	Yes	Partial: many features are user-customizable, templates	Yes, old page becomes a redirect
Midgard Wiki	Yes	No	Yes	Yes	Partial: templates, CSS	No
MindTouch	Yes	Yes	Yes	Optional	Yes	Yes
MoinMoin	Yes	Yes, BadContent filtering via Regular Expressions, Textchas	Yes, very flexible ACLs, wiki-editable groups	Yes: safe	Yes: themes, templates, CSS, XSLT, user editable navigation	Yes, old page can be a redirect
MojoMojo	Yes	Yes, CAPTCHA	Yes, cascading ACL control allowing stewardship of topics	Yes: safe	Yes: themes, CSS	Yes, current: page redirect, soon: Node moving
MyInfo	Yes	—N/a	No	Yes	Yes, web site export customization	Yes, links to renamed document are also renamed
Notion						
Obsidian	Yes	—N/a	—N/a	Yes	Yes, templates and themes, HTML, CSS	Yes
PBworks	Yes	Yes: passwords, SSO-capable integration, ACLs, IP address white–black listing	Yes	Yes, and plugins	Partial: CSS	No
PhpWiki	Yes	Yes, CPAN Blog::SpamAssassin	Yes	plugin	themes; undocumented	Yes
PmWiki	Yes	Yes, multiple	Yes, per page, per namespace, per action, per user groups (option)	Yes, module	Yes, themes, per page or group CSS, more	Yes, page with redirect (module), uploads (module)
SamePage	Yes	Yes	Yes	Yes	Yes	Yes
Semantic MediaWiki	Yes	Yes, URL blacklist, word blacklist, IP address blocking, CAPTCHAs	Partial: very limited read access control	Yes	Yes: Yes, templates and themes, html and css	Yes, old page becomes a redirect
SharePoint Foundation	Yes	Yes	Yes	Yes	Yes	Yes
SharePoint Server	Yes	Yes	Yes	Yes	Yes	Yes
Socialtext	Yes	Yes	Yes	Yes	Yes	Yes
Swiki	Yes	Yes, block IP addresses, words, UserIDs	Yes	Yes	For AniAniWebs, CSS	Yes, updating all backlinks
TiddlyWiki	Yes, plugin	No, intended for personal use only	No, intended for personal use only	Yes	Yes, themes, user CSS, modules	Yes
Tiki Wiki CMS Groupware	Yes	Yes, CAPTCHA for registration and anonymous edits or comments, encrypted email addresses.	Yes	Yes	themes, user CSS, modules	Yes
Trac	Yes	Yes	Yes	Yes	Yes, templates and themes, html and css	Yes
Traction TeamPage	Yes, with WebDAV versioning	Yes, CAPTCHA for registration, block lists	Yes	Yes safe	Yes, workspace templates, color templates, and developer tools	Yes, links are updated automatically and name history maintained
TWiki	Yes	Yes	Yes	Yes	templates, skins, user CSS	Yes, fixing backlinks
UseModWiki	Yes	Yes, IP address blacklist	No	Yes	Partial, CSS	Yes, admins only
Wiki.js	Yes	Yes, ACL	Yes	Yes	Yes, layouts, HTML, CSS	Yes
XWiki	Yes	Yes, CAPTCHA, ACL	Yes	Yes	Yes, style-sheets, templates, themes, skin extensions	Yes
Wiki software	File uploading, attachments	Spam prevention	Page access control	Inline HTML	User-customizable interface	Document renaming

== Features 2 ==
Wiki software	WYSIWYG editing	Web feeds	Export, import	Extensibility	Selectable wiki syntax	Wiki farms	Outliner mechanism	Automatic TOC	Other features
BlueSpice	Yes	Yes, RSS	Yes, see MediaWiki	Yes		Yes		Yes	
BookStack	Yes	No	No	Partial	Partial, Markdown		No	Yes	
Central Desktop	Yes	Yes, RSS	No						
Confluence	Yes	Yes, RSS	Partial, web UI	Yes, Java plug-ins, user macros in Apache Velocity	No			Yes	Marketplace Apps, Encryption in Cloud version
ConnectedText	No	Yes, RSS	Yes, many options for export, fewer options for import	Yes, scripting of pages using Python and other programming languages	No	No	Yes	Yes	
DokuWiki	Yes, plugin available	Yes, RSS/Atom	Yes, to xml, text, html pages, LaTeX, Open doc format, pdf with plugins	Yes, plugin API	Yes	Yes	Yes	Yes	Section Editing, XHTML-Compliant, tables, side-by-side diff, namespaces, Interwiki
FlexWiki	No	Yes, RSS	No	ASP, WikiTalk, .NET Reflection plugins					Forms, scripting, integrated weblog, threaded message forum
Foswiki	Yes, pre-installed plugin	Yes, RSS/Atom, with search string	No	400+ extensions; Plugin API for developers; Foswiki markup/scripting for users to create wiki applications	Yes, user selectable wiki syntax with EditSyntaxPlugin			Yes	
Gitit	Yes	No Markdown and other lightweight markup languages	Yes via pandoc	Yes Custom Macros	Yes Custom Macros	Yes	Yes		
Gollum	No: Uses ACE editor with a preview pane	Yes, RSS	Yes: uses text-based markup languages	Yes	Yes	Yes: with third-party software		Yes	Section Editing, Multiple Markup Languages, RTL Languages, UML Diagrams, YAML frontmatter
IBM Connections	Yes	Yes, RSS, Atom	No	Yes	Yes	Yes	Yes		Tagging, Discussions, Notifications (mail or in product), Reports, CMS, Templating
Jive	Yes	Yes	No	Yes, both functionality and theme via plugins	No				
JotSpot	Yes	Yes, RSS, per page	No	plugins, server-side Javascript					
MediaWiki	Yes, bundled extension (VisualEditor)	Yes, RSS/Atom	Yes (web UI, web API, shell)	actions, handlers	MediaWiki syntax	Yes		Yes	Visual editor, extensions via PHP modules, collaboration
Midgard Wiki	No	Yes, RSS, all changes	No	PHP component architecture					CMS integration
MindTouch	Yes	Yes, RSS, XML, JSON	No	API, Service Oriented Architecture					
MoinMoin	Yes, v1.5+	Yes, RSS, last changes	No	different plugin types	Yes, selectable parsers				
MojoMojo	Yes, With live preview	Yes, RSS	No	Yes, plugins and custom additions types	Yes, Multiple markup parsers available				
MyInfo	Yes	—N/a	Yes, to html, rtf, txt, web site, PDF via print driver	Yes, import and export plugins API	No	No	Yes	Yes	Tagging, metadata, attachments
Obsidian	Yes	—N/a	Yes, to Markdown, PDF, and Pandoc	Yes, plugin API, 1000+ plugins and themes	No	Yes, via Obsidian Publish	Yes, via plugins	Yes	Graph, Infinite canvas, tagging, metadata, attachments
PBworks	Yes	Yes, RSS/Atom	No	API, AuthAPI, plugins, wikilets					
PhpWiki	Yes, module	Yes RSS/Atom/RDF: global, per page or per user	No	plugins	Creole				support all databases
PmWiki	Yes, Addon	Yes, RSS/Atom/RDF (option): global, per namespace, per page or per watchlist; feed readers (plugins)	Yes, modules	Yes, very, 500+ plugins and configuration recipes	Yes, Creole (option), Markdown (plugin)	Yes	Section editing, section toggle (modules)	Yes, Modules	PageVariables and PageLists, blogs (addons), picture galleries (addons), embed maps/videos (addons). Highly flexible ACLs.
SamePage	Yes	Yes, RSS feeds,	No	plugins					
Semantic MediaWiki	Yes, bundled extension (VisualEditor)	Yes, RSS/Atom	Yes (RDF, JSON, CSV and other "result formats". Web UI, web API, shell)	actions, handlers	MediaWiki syntax	Yes		Yes	Internal query language, visual editor, extensions via PHP modules, collaboration
SharePoint Foundation	Yes	Yes, RSS feeds	No	Yes: themes, WebParts, API	Yes (limited)	Yes	Yes	No	Lists, CMS, weblog, tagging, discussion notifications, reports, workflow, enterprise level security
SharePoint Server	Yes	Yes, RSS feeds	No	Yes: themes, WebParts, API	Yes (limited)	Yes	Yes	No	Forms(InfoPath), Lists, CMS, Weblog, Tagging, Discussions, Notifications, Reports, Enterprise level security, Workflow, Enterprise Search
Socialtext	Yes	Yes, RSS feeds, Google/Technorati search results	No	using REST/SOAP APIs					
Swiki	No		Some						
TiddlyWiki	Yes, with FCKeditor or other plugin	Yes, RSS	Yes	Yes plugins, macros, themes, css	Creole			Yes	
Tiki Wiki CMS Groupware	Yes, with FCKeditor or via Quicktag insertion	Yes, RSS/Atom/RDF	No	Hundreds of features, plugins, modules & mods	No	Yes (e.g. Siteground)		Yes	
Trac	Yes with plugin	Yes, RSS	Yes with plugins	Yes limited					ticket system, access source code repositories (git, mercurial, more), other features via plugins
Traction TeamPage	Yes	Yes, Dynamic RSS inbound, outbound	No	Plug-in architecture for widgets, forms, interface and function modifications					
TWiki	Yes, pre-installed plugin	Yes, RSS/Atom, with search string	No	400+ extensions; Plugin API for developers; TWiki markup/scripting for users to create wiki applications	Yes, user selectable wiki syntax with EditSyntaxPlugin			Yes, if "%TOC%" shortcut added to page	
UseModWiki	No	Yes, RSS	No	No, unofficial patches only	No	No	No	Partial, if <toc> is added with # added to headings	
Whizfolders	Yes	No	Yes	No	Yes, markup	No	Yes	Yes	Rich Text, RTF export, clipboard collect, Print with TOC
Wiki.js	Yes	No	Yes	Yes	Markdown		Yes	Yes	Built-in search
Wikispaces	Yes	Yes, RSS/Atom	No	API, widgets, single sign-on (SSO)					
XWiki	Yes, using CKEditor and various plugins developed for it	Yes, RSS	Yes, XAR (zipped XWiki ARchive) files	Yes, component, plugins, macros, scripts, applications	Yes, based on WikiModel, support syntaxes from other wikis	Yes	No	Yes, using the {{toc}} macro	
Wiki software	WYSIWYG editing	Web feeds	Export, import	Extensibility	Selectable wiki syntax	Wiki farms	Outliner mechanism	Automatic TOC	Other features

== Installation ==
Wiki software	Platform	Typical installation size (MB)	Web server needed	Other software needed	Installable to USB stick
BlueSpice	Linux, Unix, Windows, others		IIS–Apache, Tomcat	MySQL, Oracle	No
BookStack	Linux, Unix, Windows, others		PHP-compatible webserver	PHP 8.0.2+, MySQL or MariaDB, Git, Composer	No
Central Desktop	N/A: hosted		None	None	
Confluence	Microsoft Windows, macOS, Linux, Oracle Solaris		Tomcat included, or use your own servlet container.	Java 1.8, database such as PostgreSQL, MySQL, Oracle, SQL Server, etc.	
ConnectedText	Microsoft Windows		None	Python optional	Yes
DokuWiki	Linux, Unix, Windows, others	17	Should work on any web server with PHP	PHP	Yes
FlexWiki	Linux, Unix, Windows, others		IIS–Apache	ASP.NET, Mono	
Foswiki	Linux, Unix, Windows, others		Any Web server with cgi support.	Perl, RCS	Yes
Gitit	Cross platform		Yes. Happstack; can also be used locally.	LaTeX; Versioning system like Git, Darcs, or Mercurial	No
Gollum	Cross platform		No (built in), but possible (Apache, Nginx, Puma, etc.)	None	Yes
IBM Connections	Linux (RHEL & SLES), Unix (AIX), Windows		IBM HTTP Server (Apache clone with specific IBM Tuning possibilities) or any other WebServer which can couple with WebSphere.	All software needed is delivered as one package	No
Jive	Java 1.5 + one of: Windows Server 2003 SP2, Linux (2.6 Kernel), Solaris 10		Tomcat, WebLogic, WebSphere	MS SQL, Postgres, MySQL or Oracle	
JotSpot	Linux, Unix, Windows, others		None (built-in)	VMware Player	
MediaWiki	Linux, Unix, Windows, others		Any web server that supports PHP 7.4.3+	PHP; one of MariaDB, MySQL, PostgreSQL, SQLite	Yes
Midgard Wiki	Linux, Unix & others		Apache with PHP	MySQL, PHP	
MindTouch	Linux, Unix, Windows, others		Apache, IIS6, IIS7, IIS8	Mono, MySQl, PHP	
MoinMoin	Linux, Macs, Unix, Windows, others		None for Desktop version	Python	Yes
MojoMojo	Linux, Macs, Unix, Windows, others		None: builtin server suitable for desktop or production use	SQL database (MySQL, PostgreSQL, Sqlite)	
MyInfo	Microsoft Windows		None	None	Yes
Obsidian	macOS, Windows, Linux, iOS, Android		None	None	
PhpWiki	Linux, Unix, Windows, others		Any Web server with PHP	PHP	
PmWiki	Linux, Unix, Windows, others	8	Any Web server with PHP, can run without a web server.	PHP	Yes
Semantic MediaWiki	Linux, Unix, Windows, others		Any web server that supports PHP 7.4.3+	PHP; one of MariaDB, MySQL, PostgreSQL, SQLite	Yes
SharePoint Foundation	Windows Server		IIS	Optional SQL Server	
SharePoint Server	Windows Server or SaaS		IIS or SaaS	Optional SQL Server	
Socialtext	N/A: hosted		No, all needed components included	No, all needed components included	
Swiki	Linux, Unix, Windows, others		None: installs own server; can coexist with IIS and Apache by running on alternate port	None	
TiddlyWiki	Any (that runs common browsers)		None	Runs in regular browser	Yes
Tiki Wiki CMS Groupware	Linux, Unix, Windows, others		Any Web server with PHP	PHP	Yes
Trac	Linux, Windows		Recommended (fcgi or wsgi), builtin available	SQL database (MySQL, PostgreSQL, Sqlite)	
Traction TeamPage	Any OS capable of running Java 2 Virtual Machine		Jetty (included with installer)	None	
TWiki	Linux, Unix, Windows, others		Any Web server with cgi support. Web server included in VMware appliance and TWiki for MS-Windows Personal	Perl, RCS	
UseModWiki	Linux, Unix, Windows, others		Any web server with cgi support	Perl	
Whizfolders	Microsoft Windows		None	None	No
Wiki.js	Linux, Unix, Windows, others		None (built-in): Can coexist with Apache, Nginx, IIS via alternate port	PostgreSQL, MySQL, MariaDB, MSSQL or SQLite3	Yes
Wikispaces	SaaS: hosted		None	None	
XWiki	Java Platform		Any Java EE webserver	Java	Yes on Jetty/HSQL
Wiki software	Platform	Typical installation size (MB)	Web server needed	Other software needed	Installable to USB stick

== See also ==
- Comparison of
  - wiki farms
  - notetaking software
  - text editors
  - HTML editors
  - word processors
  - wiki hosting services
- List of
  - wikis
  - wiki software
  - personal information managers
  - text editors
  - outliners for
    - desktops
    - mobile devices
    - web-based
