= Wikispaces =

Former wiki hosting service

- Type: private
- Industry: Dot-com
- Founded: 2005
- Defunct: March 2014 (purchased by Tes Global); January 2019 (site taken offline)
- Headquarters: San Francisco, California, U.S.
- Key people: James Byers, Adam Frey (co-founders), Dominick Bellizzi
- Products: Wiki hosting
- Website: www.wikispaces.com

Wikispaces was a wiki hosting service based in San Francisco, California. Launched by Tangient LLC in March 2005, Wikispaces was purchased by Tes Global (formerly TSL Education) on March 9, 2014. It competed with PBworks, Wetpaint, Wikia, and Google Sites (formerly JotSpot). It was among the largest wiki hosts.

In September 2014, Tes announced that free hosting of non-educational wikis would cease. Those wikis faced a 14 November 2014 shutdown deadline. Only wikis used exclusively in K–12 or higher education would remain free. Private wikis with advanced features for businesses, non-profits and educators remained available for an annual fee. Wikispaces also gave away more than 100,000 premium wikis to K–12 educators.

Since 2010, Wikispaces had cooperated with Web 2.0 education platform Glogster EDU. Glogster EDU embedded Glogs into Wikispaces services.

Due to cost issues, classroom and free-level Wikispaces closed on July 31, 2018, while private Wikispaces closed on January 31, 2019.
