= Glog =

Glog may refer to:

- G-Log, an American software company acquired by Oracle in 2005
- GLOG, the Euronext ticker symbol for Global Graphics, a software company
- Glog, a portmanteau of “graphical blog” coined by the company Glogster
- Glog, a Slovene, Bosnian, Montenegrin, Serbian, and Croatian word for hawthorn (Crataegus); see Głogów
- Glog, a portmanteau of "grow log" usually used when describing the logging, or journaling of cannabis sativa grows
- Glögg, a Nordic mulled wine
