= Huijiwiki =

Chinese web hosting service for wikis

- Website type: Wiki hosting service
- Creators: SerGawen; Reasno
- Website: huijiwiki.com
- Commercial: No
- Launched: February 2015; 11 years ago
- Current status: active

Huijiwiki (simplified Chinese: 灰机wiki; traditional Chinese: 灰機wiki; lit. 'Gray Machine Wiki') is a Chinese-language wiki farm based on MediaWiki, launched in February 2015 by MediaWiki user SerGawen and wiki developer Reasno. The creators formerly operated the Chinese language edition of Wikia's A Song of Ice and Fire Wiki. It allows users to apply for and create wikis about a particular topic on its platform. It is currently developed and maintained by Beijing Carmen Jeno Network Technology Co., Ltd. and has more than 100,000 registered users. It is the world's fourth-largest MediaWiki-powered web platform (measured by the number of pages) and the second-largest MediaWiki farm overall.

Currently, Huijiwiki has over 400 hosted sites and close to 10 million edits have been made.

== History ==
One of the founders, Gao Anh, has always been fond of researching all kinds of worldviews and American dramas and games, and is an administrator of the A Song of Ice and Fire Chinese Wiki, which is hosted on the wiki farm Wikia. However, the limitations and poor Chinese language support at the time, along with the blocking by the People's Republic of China kept him wondering why there wasn't a wiki farm in mainland China. On the other hand, Gao Aung, who was already in his fourth year of work, began to feel bored with his job, which was planning for a handheld game. He told another administrator of the A Song of Ice and Fire Chinese Wiki, Gu Xi, about his idea of "making a wikia by himself". After a conversation, Gu Xi chose to go back to his country and work with Gao Aang to make a "wikia in China".

The first wiki hosted on Huijiwiki after its creation was the Song of Ice and Fire Chinese Wiki.

On January 19, 2022, Huijiwiki was mistakenly thought to be closed because the owner forgot to renew the server.
