= Mark Guzdial =

American academic (born 1962)

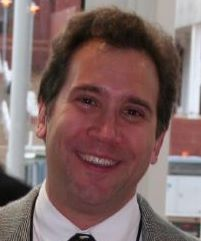
- Born: Mark Joseph Guzdial; September 7, 1962 (age 64); Detroit, Michigan, USA
- Citizenship: United States
- Education: University of Michigan (Ph.D.); Wayne State University
- Known for: Emile; Swiki; Media Computation
- Awards: SIGCSE Award for Outstanding Contribution to Computer Science Education (2019); ACM Fellow (2014); IEEE Computer Science and Engineering Undergraduate Teaching Award (2013)
- Scientific career
- Fields: Computer science education; Learning sciences; Learning technologies; Computer-supported collaborative learning
- Workplaces: University of Michigan; Georgia Tech; GVU Center
- Thesis: Emile: Software-Realized Scaffolding for Science Learners Programming Multiple Media (1993)
- Doctoral advisor: Elliot Soloway
- Website: https://guzdial.engin.umich.edu/

Mark Joseph Guzdial (born September 7, 1962) is a Professor in the College of Engineering at the University of Michigan. He was formerly a professor in the School of Interactive Computing at the Georgia Institute of Technology affiliated with the College of Computing and the GVU Center. He has conducted research in the fields of computer science education and the learning sciences and internationally in the field of Information Technology. From 2001–2003, he was selected to be an ACM Distinguished Lecturer, and in 2007 he was appointed Vice-Chair of the ACM Education Board Council. He was the original developer of the CoWeb (or Swiki), one of the earliest wiki engines, which was implemented in Squeak and has been in use at institutions of higher education since 1998. He is the inventor of the Media Computation approach to learning introductory computing, which uses contextualized computing education to attract and retain students.

== Education ==
Mark Guzdial was born in Michigan and attended Wayne State University for his undergraduate studies, earning a Bachelor of Science degree in computer science in 1984. He received a master's degree in 1986 in Computer Science and Engineering at Wayne State University. Guzdial went on to receive a Ph.D. at the University of Michigan in 1993 in Computer Science and Education where he was advised by Elliot Soloway. His thesis created an environment for high school science learners to program multimedia demonstrations and physics simulations. After graduating from the University of Michigan, Guzdial accepted a position as an assistant professor at the Georgia Institute of Technology College of Computing. In 2018, he became a full professor in the College of Engineering at the University of Michigan.

== Research and teaching ==
Guzdial's research projects include Media Computation, an approach that emphasizes context in computer science education, using programming languages, lectures examples, and programming assignments from those contexts that students recognize as being authentic and relevant for computing.

Guzdial's Media Computation curriculum is being used at universities across the country. He received a grant from the National Science Foundation in 2006 to pursue his “Using Media Computation to Attract and Retain Students in Computing” curriculum.

Guzdial was Director of Undergraduate Programs at Georgia Tech (including the BS in Computer Science, BS in Computational Media, and Minor in Computer Science) until 2007. He was Lead Principal Investigator on Georgia Computes, a National Science Foundation Broadening Participation in Computing alliance focused on increasing the number and diversity of computing students in the state of Georgia.

== Publications ==
His publications include:

- 2015 Learner-Centered Design of Computing Education: Research on Computing for Everyone (Synthesis Lectures on Human-Centered Informatics).
- 2006. Introduction to Computing and Programming with Java: A Multimedia Approach. (with Barbara Ericson)
- 2004. Introduction to Computing and Programming in Python: A Multimedia Approach.
- 2001. Squeak: Open Personal Computing and Multimedia. (with Kim Rose)
- 2000. Squeak: Object-Oriented Design with Multimedia Applications.

=== Awards and honors ===
In 2010, Guzdial was awarded the Karl V. Karlstrom Outstanding Educator Award "for [his] contributions to computing education, through the Media Computation (MediaComp) approach that they have created, supported, and disseminated, and its impact on broadening participation in computing." In 2012, he received the IEEE Computer Science and Engineering Undergraduate Teaching Award "for outstanding and sustained excellence in computing education through innovative teaching, mentoring, inventive course development, and knowledge dissemination." In 2014, Guzdial was elected a Fellow of the Association for Computing Machinery "for contributions to computing education, and broadening participation." In 2019, Guzdial was awarded the ACM SIGCSE Award for Outstanding Contribution to Computer Science Education at the 50th SIGCSE Technical Symposium "in recognition of a significant contribution to computer science education".

== Personal life ==
Guzdial was married to Barbara Ericson in July 1985. They have three children, Matthew, Katherine, and Jennifer.
