= BlueSpice =

Wiki software

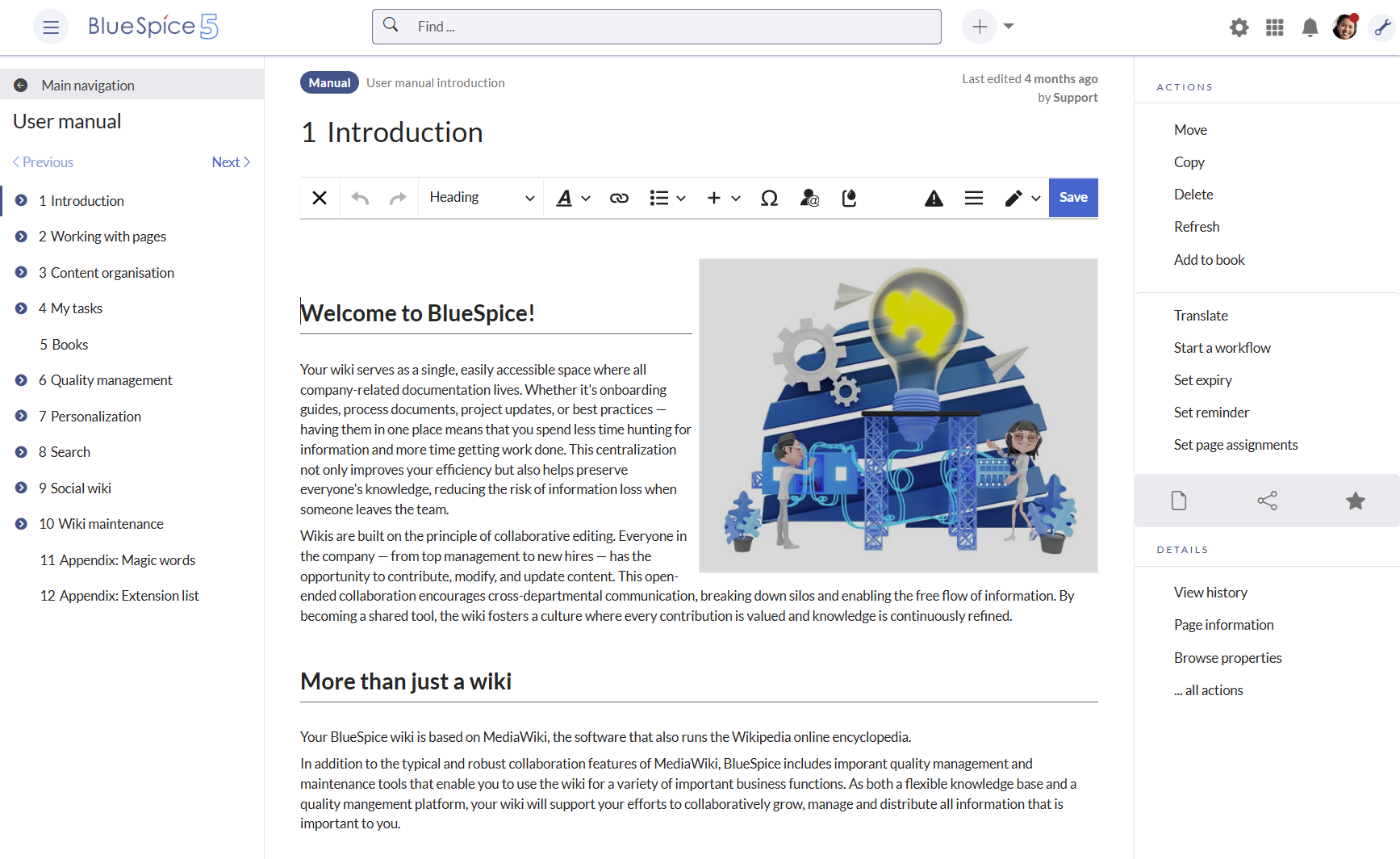
- BlueSpice 5
- Original authors: Markus Glaser, Robert Vogel e.a.
- Developer: Hallo Welt! GmbH
- Release: March 2011
- Stable release: 5.2 / 2026-01-22[±]
- Written in: PHP
- Size: 107.21 MiB (free edition)
- Type: Wiki
- License: GPLv3
- Website: bluespice.com

BlueSpice is free wiki software based on the MediaWiki engine and licensed with the GNU General Public License. It is especially developed for businesses as an enterprise wiki distribution for MediaWiki and used in over 150 countries.

The freely available version BlueSpice free is considered one of the most popular wiki computer programs for knowledge management in companies.

== History ==
The German company Hallo Welt! has been working on the development of an open source wiki based on MediaWiki since 2007. The origins of the later BlueSpice software go back to an initiative by the IBM CTO Gunter Dueck, who initiated an internal company wiki for IBM Germany in 2007 under the name "bluepedia". The model for the bluepedia project was Wikipedia and accordingly the platform was based on MediaWiki. However, in daily operation, additional requirements arose for the software used. This led to the founding of a company that would develop and provide the missing functions in the future.

In 2011, Hallo Welt! decided to publish their wiki as free and open-source software. The stable version of BlueSpice for MediaWiki was released July 4, 2011. From this point on, a free download was available at SourceForge. A key feature of the software was the provision of a WYSIWYG editor, which at the time was based on the TinyMCE editor.

In Autumn 2013, Hallo Welt! released the completely reworked version BlueSpice 2. According to the BlueSpice developers this release aims for opening up BlueSpice for freelance developers in the global MediaWiki community and multiple language versions.

In 2014, BlueSpice for MediaWiki became a project of Translatewiki.net. In January 2015 the developers announced that they will change to a subscription model.

Since 2017, the software is provided as Docker containers.

== Functionality and technology ==
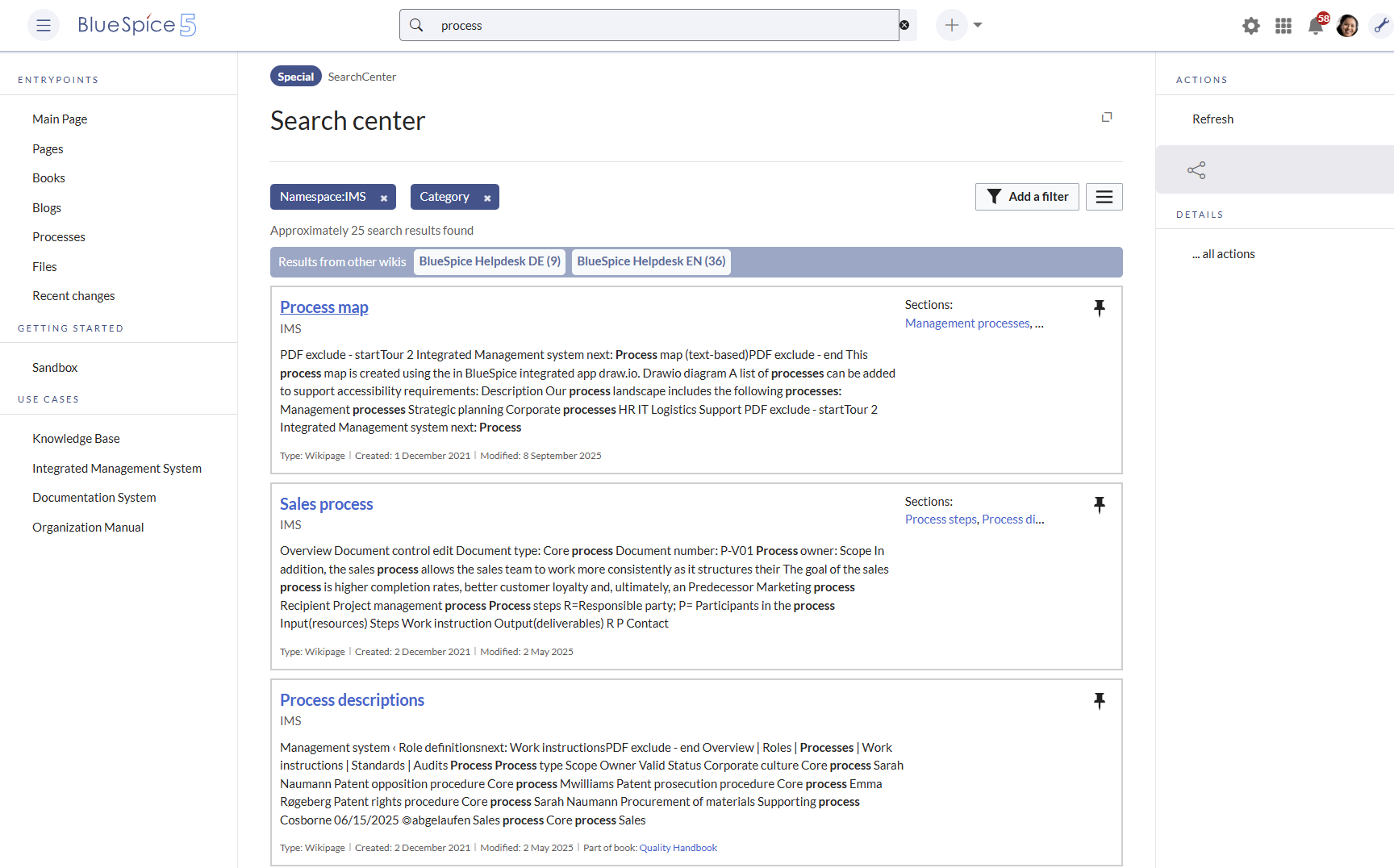
Search engine (OpenSearch)

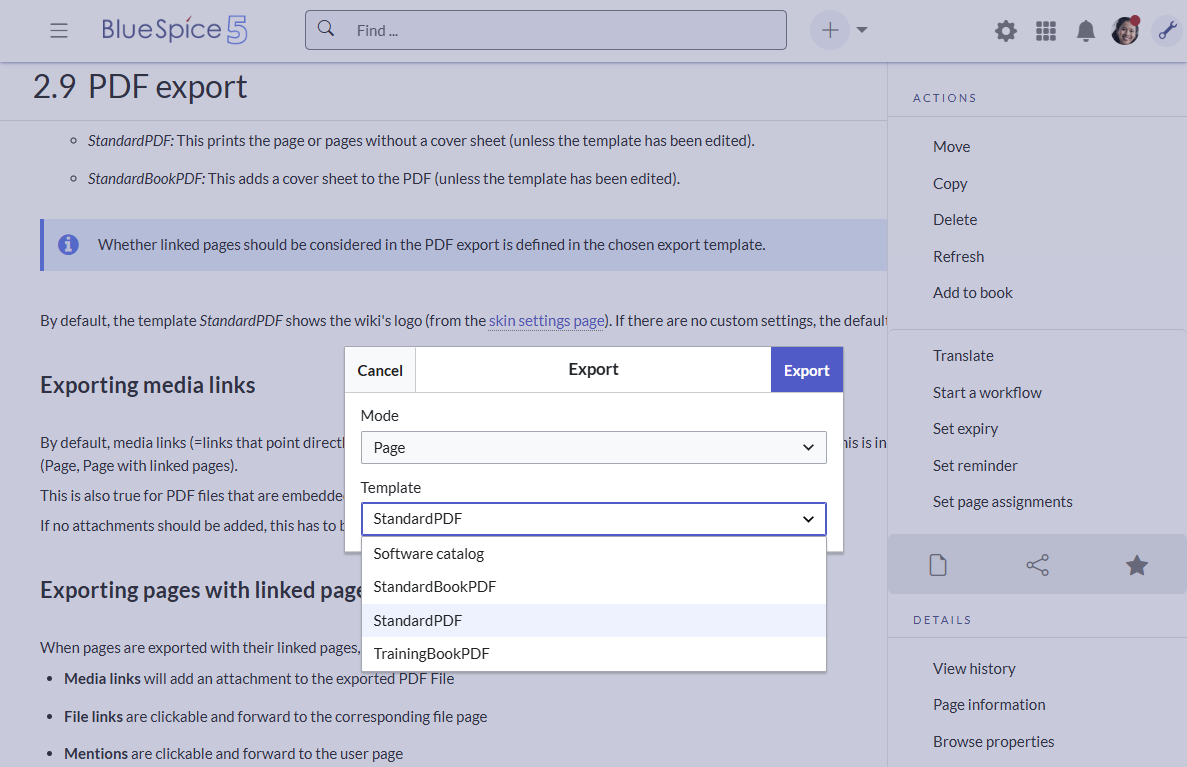
PDF export with custom templates

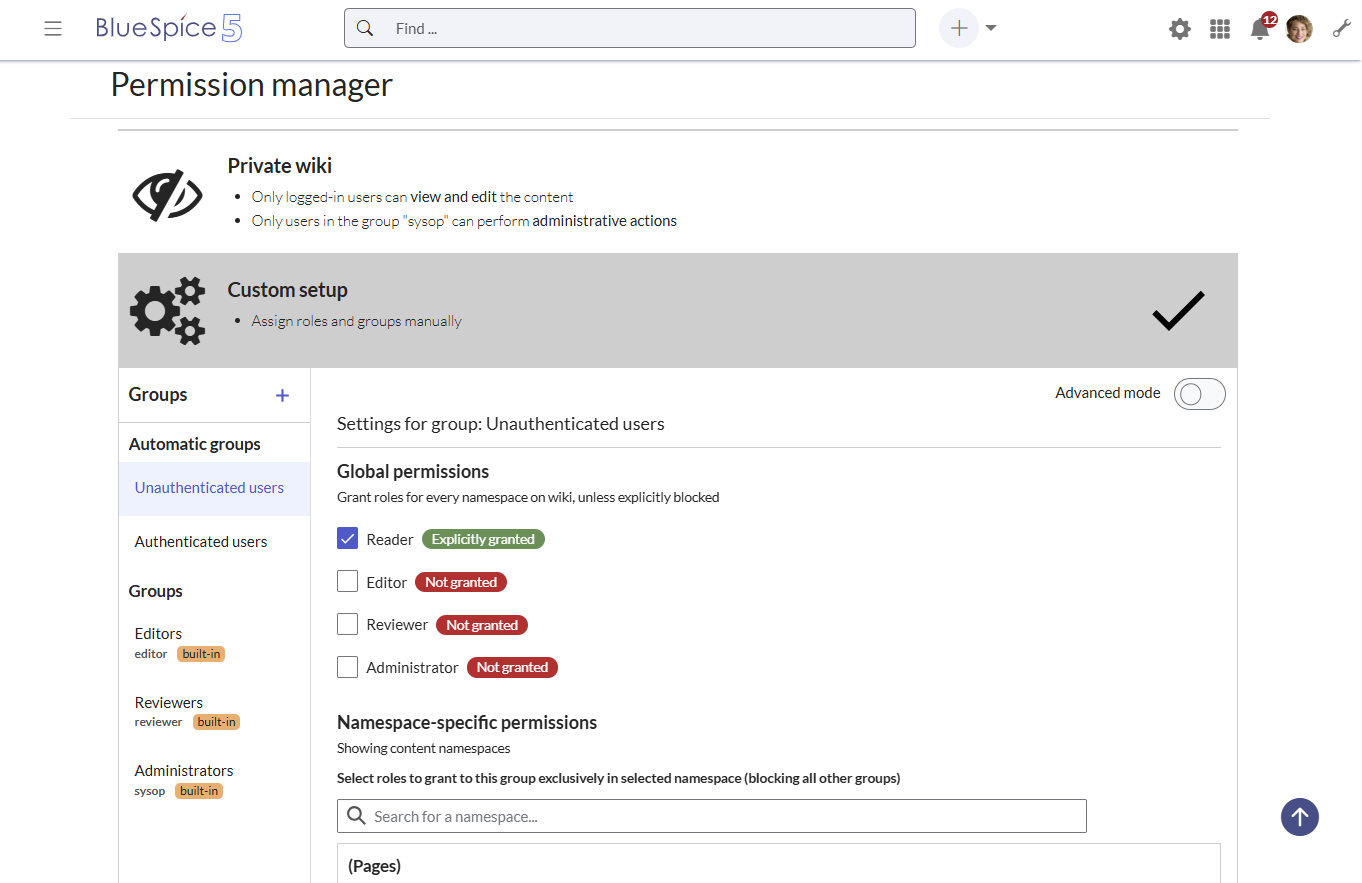
Permission manager

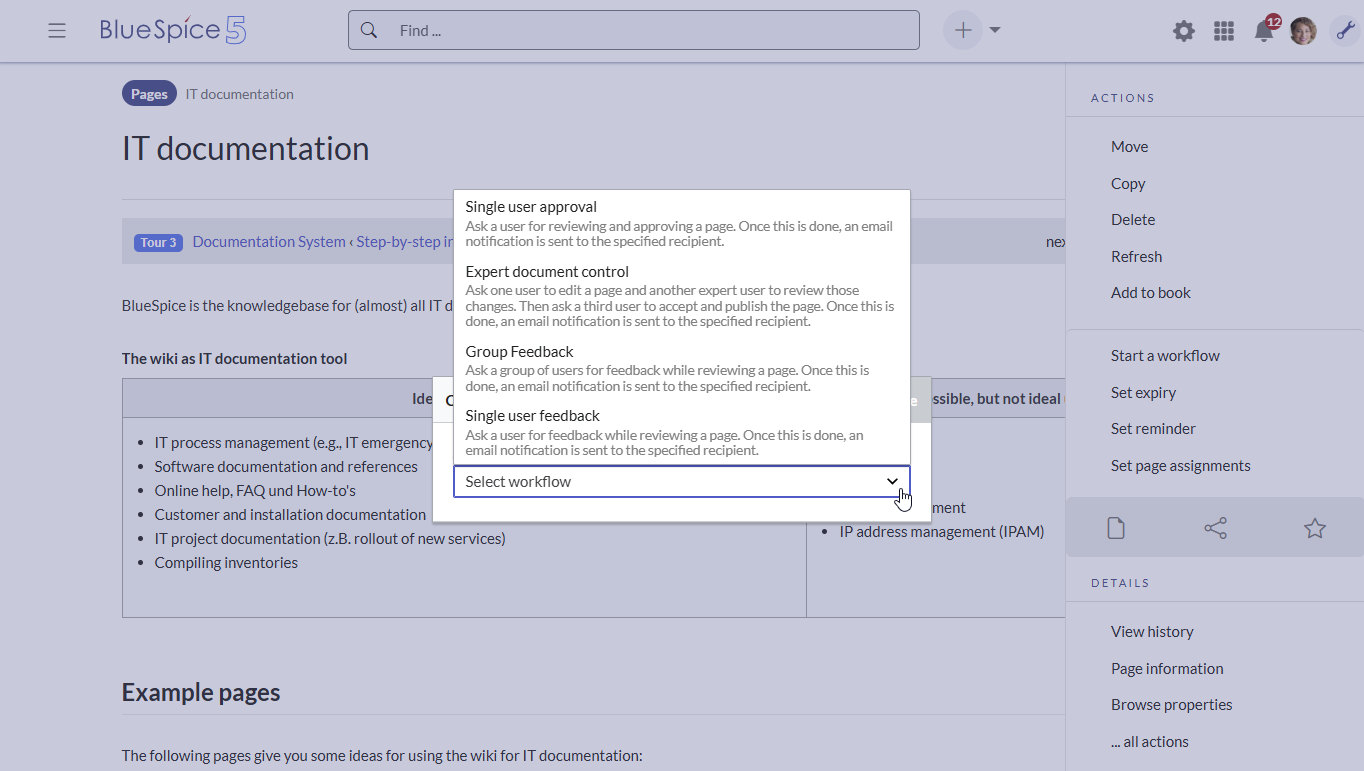
Workflows for quality control (Pro Edition)

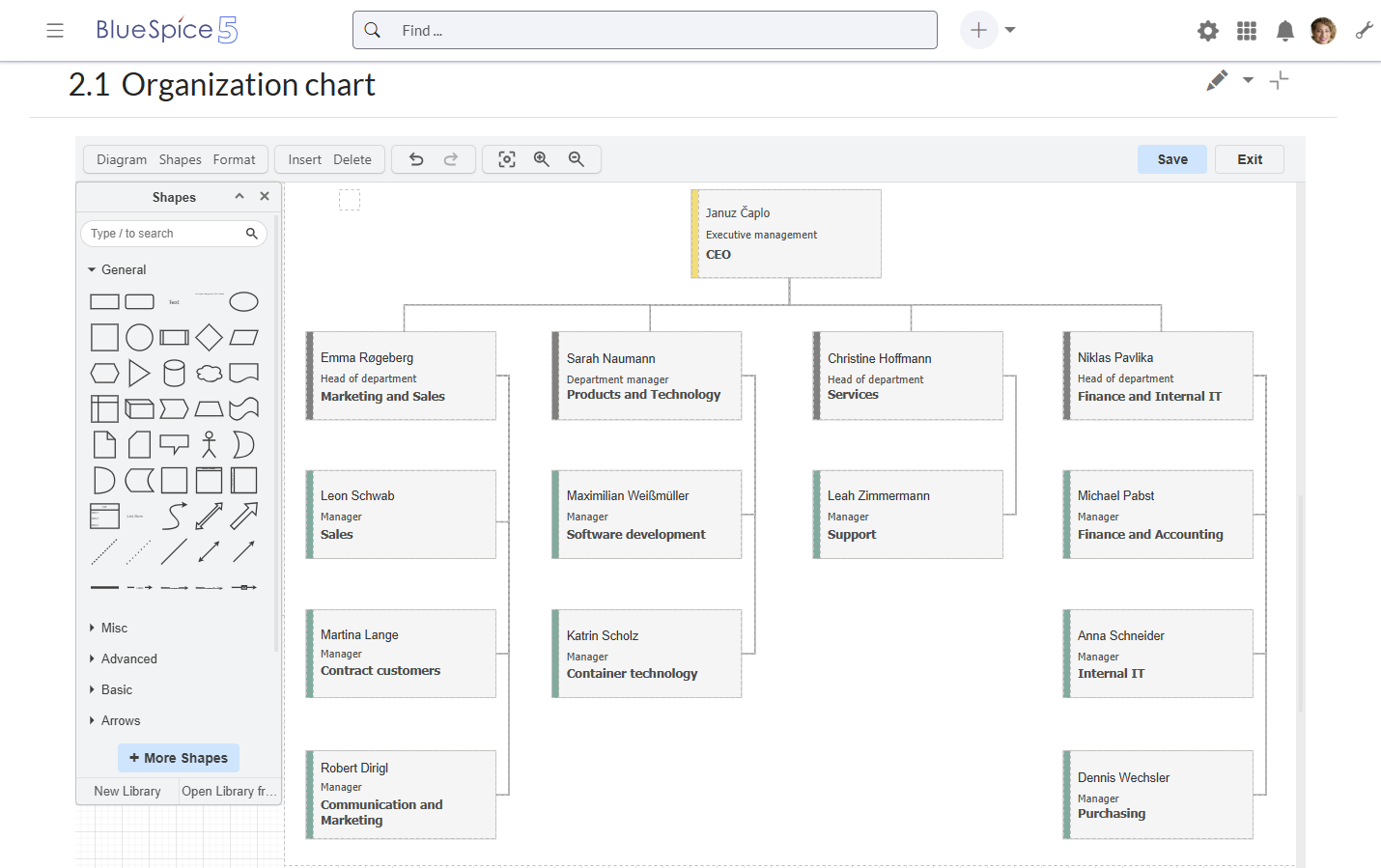
Drawio editor (Pro Edition)

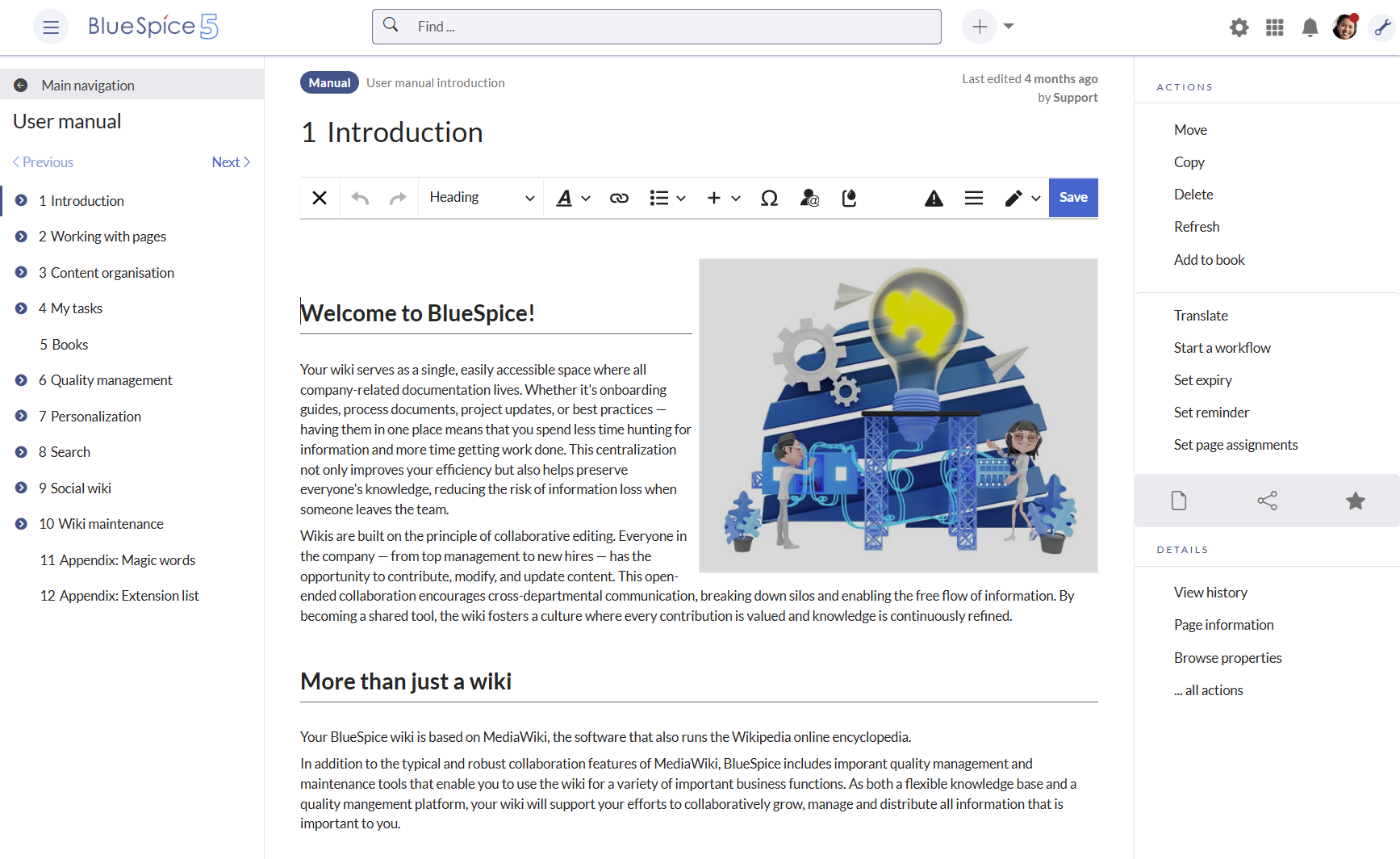
Book navigation (Pro Edition)

BlueSpice is written in the PHP programming language and uses MySQL, Nginx, Tomcat and MongoDB (for collaborative editing). BlueSpice is released in a free edition and two paid editions. The free edition adds more than 50 extensions to a MediaWiki, mainly in the areas of:

- Editing: A version of the MediaWiki VisualEditor is delivered, which, unlike the original, contains additional functions, such as an easier procedure for uploading documents or inserting dynamic content. The creation of new pages is supported by page templates.
- Search and navigation: An extended search (OpenSearch) offers improved search functionalities, like faceted search. The search results can further be sorted or filtered by category, namespace, author, data type, and more. Any uploaded local files are also fully indexed. Other common features are autocomplete and search as you type.
- Administration: Convenient management of users, namespaces, groups, rights and settings.

== Licensing and distribution ==
All extensions of the BlueSpice distributions are under open source licenses. The functions written by Hallo Welt! are published under the license GPLv3.

The free version is made available for download as a classic server installation in a tarball or as a Docker image, with BlueSpice free having the widest distribution via the official Docker version (with more than 1 million pulls in three years).

== Versions ==
Name	Version	Date of issue	Notable changes
BlueSpice 5	5.1-5.2	2025-06-04 to 2026-02-26	Redesigned user profile page, new PDF export processor with improved accessibility support, improved page layouts for various special pages. Pro Edition: Refactored BPMN process diagrams, ad-hoc translations, translation transfer between wikis in a wiki farm, revised blog functionality, comment streams. With version 5.2: integration of AI-functionality, such as a ChatBot, through a variety of extensions.
BlueSpice 4	4.1 - 4.5	2022-01-19 to 2024-07-18	Responsive skin "Discovery", OpenSearch engine, mentions & tasks functionality, content droplets in VisualEditor. menu editor interface, startpage templates. Word import (BlueSpice Pro) upload; file attachments tag; OOJS-based dialog windows; enhanced workflow activities; FlexiSkin feature, introduction of BPMN diagrams, two-factor authentication, enhanced connectivity, structured data import support.
BlueSpice 3	3.0 - 3.1	2018-10-17 to 2019-09-19	Responsive skin "Calumma", revised title area and navigation, improved search scoring, enhanced table formatting, improved document embedding, support for nginx web server, improved screen reader support, release of BlueSpice repositories, public docker image for BlueSpice free. Role-based permission, reworked authentication stack for LDAP and SAML; Social discussions and blogs; Extended search based on Elasticsearch.
BlueSpice 2	2.22.0 - 2.27.2	2013-11-27 to 2017-07-20	Reworked skin, VisualEditor integration, "Insert templates" function, revised permission manager, combined notifications, one-click signatures, maps integration, better file management, category manager, review with semantic properties, page assignments, showtime video player and read confirmations. Full compatibility with MediaWiki 1.27, improvements of the WikiFarm Package, integration of SemanticMediaWiki, new internationalisation framework, FlexiSkin, Dashboards. Integrated package installer for MediaWiki and BlueSpice, support of MobileFrontend, memcached support, reworked localisation, context menues.
BlueSpice 1	1.1	2012-03-15	Performance improvements, support for postgreSQL and Oracle databases
BlueSpice 1	basic	2010-11-17	

== See also ==
- MediaWiki
- Comparison of wiki software
