= Wetpaint =

Internet company

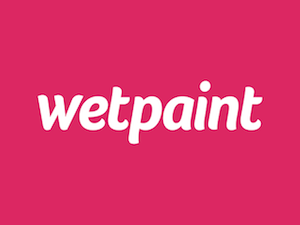
- Type: Subsidiary
- Industry: Internet technology (2006–2018)
- Founded: October 2005
- Defunct: 2020
- Headquarters: New York City, U.S.
- Products: Technology platforms for the media industry; formerly wiki hosting
- Revenue: Venture capital funded
- Owner: Function(X)
- Number of employees: 65
- Website: http://www.wetpaint.com (defunct as of mid-2020)

Wetpaint was an Internet company and a wholly owned subsidiary of Function(X). Founded in 2005, Wetpaint both published the website Wetpaint Entertainment, focused on entertainment news, and developed a proprietary technology platform, the Social Distribution System, that was used to provide analytics for its own website as well as other online publishers. Wetpaint began as a wiki farm, hosting wikis using its own proprietary software, before moving into hosting of professional content in 2010.

== History ==
Wetpaint was originally called Wikisphere, and begun as a wiki farm, hosting wikis using proprietary software. It was co-founded in October 2005 by Ben Elowitz, who had previously co-founded the online jewelry retailer Blue Nile Inc. In December 2005, the company and site were renamed to Wetpaint. In October 2005, the company received its initial A round of venture capital funding of US$5.25 million from Trinity Ventures and Frazier Technology Ventures. Wetpaint closed a US$9.5 million 'B' round of funding in January 2007, adding Accel Partners to the list of investors. Wetpaint closed a Series C round of venture capital funding of US$25 million in May 2008. Investors included Accel Partners, Trinity Ventures, and Frazier Technology Ventures.

Wetpaint was named by Time Magazine as one of the 50 Best Websites of 2007.

In March 2008, Wetpaint added social networking features.

In July 2009, Wetpaint laid off 15 of their 56 employees. An additional 9 employees, including co-founders Kevin Flaherty and Alex Berg, were laid off in December. The company also decided to refocus the website on professionally created content. Both steps were taken as a result of declining online ad revenue.

During late 2009, Wetpaint re-launched its main homepage, at wetpaint.com, as the Wetpaint Entertainment platform, a set of new online TV fan destination sites, geared toward the female 18-34 demographic. The wiki farm was renamed "Wikis by Wetpaint", and was moved to the domain wetpaintcentral.com.

In December 2010, the company announced the Wetpaint Social Distribution System.

In December 2012, Wetpaint was acquired by Viggle, an entertainment rewards platform, which was shortly renamed to its former name, Function(X).

Wetpaint's wiki-hosting component was spun off completely in 2013 after being purchased by Wikifoundry. Wikifoundry ceased operations in June 2021, decommissioning the original Wetpaint wiki-farm after 15 years. Updates to wetpaint.com stopped in 2018, leaving the site stagnant until it finally went defunct in mid-2020. Later at the end of that year, Adobe Flash shut down, which was what WikiFoundry ran on.
