= Wiki.js =

Wiki engine written in JavaScript

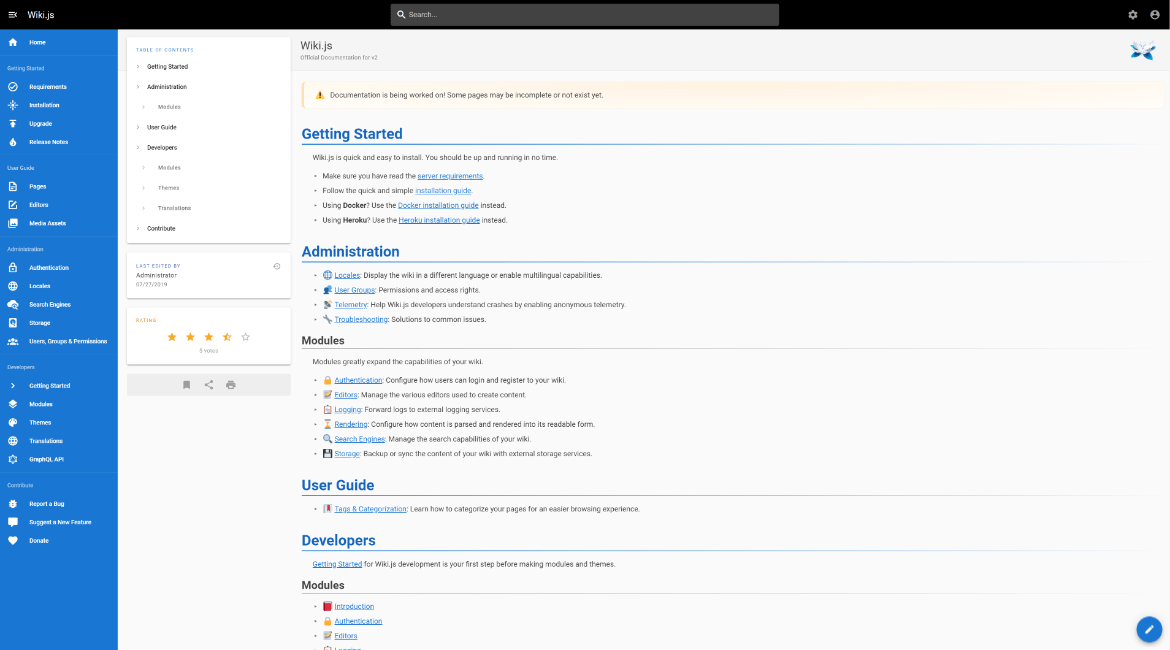
- Developers: Nicolas Giard and community members
- Initial release: September 12, 2016; 9 years ago
- Stable release: 2.5.314 / 2026-05-01; 3 days ago
- Written in: JavaScript
- Operating system: Cross-platform
- Platform: Cross-platform
- Available in: Multilingual
- Type: Wiki software
- License: AGPL
- Website: js.wiki
- Repository: github.com/Requarks/wiki

Wiki.js is a wiki engine running on Node.js and written in JavaScript. It is free software released under the Affero GNU General Public License. It is available as a self-hosted solution or using "single-click" install on the DigitalOcean marketplace.

== Features ==
=== Markdown editor ===
Content is written using the Markdown syntax, using a visual editor, and saved directly as Markdown files.

=== Git-backed storage ===
Content is continuously synced with a remote Git repository, which serves both as a backup and single source of truth in case of restores or multiple servers setup. Git in 2.x is optional and can be replaced with other storage providers.

=== Integrated access control ===
Access can be given to all or specific sections of the wiki. Guest view is supported. More integrations are planned to be added in the next major upgrade to Wiki.js.

=== Authentication ===
Authentication with Wiki.js can be done in many ways. Some popular authentication methods are Local Authentication, LDAP/Active Directory, Google OAuth, GitHub, Discord or SAML 2.0. With future updates, more providers are being added such as Microsoft and Central Authentication Service.

=== Assets management ===
Media content such as images, videos, documents or any type of files can be inserted into content. Assets can be classified under folders and thumbnails are automatically generated for compatible media.

=== Built-in search engine ===
All content is automatically indexed and accessible from any page via the search bar. Administrators have the ability to use external search engines if required.

== System requirements ==
Prerequisites for running Wiki.js 2.x:

- Node.js 22.0 or later
- One of the following database engines:
  - PostgreSQL 9.5 or later
  - MySQL 8.0 or later
  - MariaDB 10.2.7 or later
  - SQLite 3.9 or later
  - MS SQL server 2012 or later

== License ==
Wiki.js is free and open source software and is distributed under the terms of the Affero GNU General Public License.

== Previous Releases ==
=== 1.x ===
Wiki.js 1.x ran on MongoDB and required a git repository. It was replaced by 2.0 on November 17th, 2019.

System Prerequisites:

- Node.js 6.11.1 or later
- MongoDB 3.2 or later
- A public or private Git repository (Any standard Git server, GitHub, GitLab, BitBucket, Visual Studio Team Services, etc.)

== See also ==
- Comparison of wiki software
- List of wiki software
