= Central Desktop =

Wiki hosting service

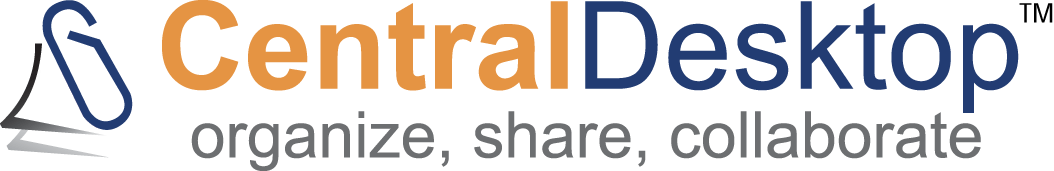
- Developer: Central Desktop
- Operating system: Cross-platform
- Type: Collaborative software
- Website: Central Desktop

Central Desktop is a collaboration software. The company's primary focus is providing a Software-as-a-Service collaboration tool to small and medium-sized businesses. The company and its products are most often compared to other wiki-based and project-centric solutions such as SharePoint and Basecamp. As of November 2013, the company serves more than 650,000 users worldwide with customers such as Gymboree, Nielsen, CBS, The Ritz-Carlton, Netflix and Harvard University.

== History ==
The company was founded by CEO Isaac Garcia and CTO Arnulf Hsu in 2005. Prior to founding Central Desktop, Isaac and Arnulf started Upgradebase in 1997, a product data provider to the computer and consumer electronics industry, and Vendorbase in 1999, a B2B marketplace for computer resellers. Both companies were acquired by CNET Networks in 2002.

In December 2006, the company accused Google of unfairly competing against its own customers by bidding on keywords that Google held an interest in. Google responded to the accusations on its own AdWords blog.

Central Desktop received $7 million in first round funding from OpenView Venture Partners in April 2008.

In October 2014, Central Desktop was acquired by PGI (Premier Global Services, Inc.) and rebranded to iMeet Central in November 2015. There are no more community edition available and so users are now restricted to paid services.

On May 7, 2024 it was announced that iMeetCentral had been acquired - by the original founding team of Central Desktop! The company will be, once again, known as Central Desktop - going back to its origin at the company's founding in 2005. The acquisition also comes with an infusion from the Founders to invest in the company and the platform.

== Products ==
Central Desktop is offered in two editions - Workgroup and Enterprise.

In February 2010, the company released version 2.0 of its software, Central Desktop 2.0. New features in Central Desktop 2.0 include an online file viewer that supports more than 200 different file types, improved wiki navigation and the ability to convert any file type into a downloadable PDF document.

Central Desktop product features include:

- Wikis
- WYSIWYG editing
- Document management
- Integrated Lucene search (full text searches for Word, Excel, PowerPoint and PDF files)
- Online documents
- Online spreadsheets
- Task management
- Discussion threads
- Online file viewer
- Web conferencing
- Workflow solutions
- Microblogging

== See also ==
- Comparison of wiki software
- List of collaborative software
- Comparison of wiki farms
- Online office suite
- Cloud collaboration
- Document collaboration
- Document-centric collaboration
