= IEEE Computer Science and Engineering Undergraduate Teaching Award =

IEEE Computer Science & Engineering Undergraduate Teaching Award
- Awarded for: To honor teachers of computer science and related engineering disciplines.
- Presented by: IEEE Computer Society
- Rewards: The award consists of a certificate, and honorarium.
- First award: 1999
- Website: IEEE Computer Science & Engineering Undergraduate Teaching Award

The IEEE Computer Science & Undergraduate Teaching Award is a Technical Field Award of the IEEE that was established by the IEEE Computer Society in 1999. It is presented for outstanding contributions to undergraduate computer science education through teaching and service.

The award nomination requires a minimum of 3 endorsements.

Recipients of this award receive a certificate, and honorarium.

== Recipients ==
The recipients of the IEEE Computer Science & Engineering Undergraduate Teaching Award include the following people:

- 2017: Sven Koenig
- 2016: Mark Sherriff
- 2015: Henry C.B. Chan
- 2014: Elizabeth Gerber
- 2013: Robert J. Fornaro
- 2012: Mark Guzdial
- 2011: Benjamin Hescott
- 2010: No Award
- 2009: Judy Robertson
- 2008: Elizabeth L. Burd
- 2007: Darrin M. Hanna
- 2006: No Award
- 2005: No Award
- 2004: No Award
- 2003: Sally Fincher
- 2002: Alan Clements
- 2001: Steven S. Skiena, and David G. Meyer
- 2000: No Award
- 1999: Joseph L. Zachary, and Bruce W. Weide and Timothy J. Long
