= Jive (software) =

Collaboration and knowledge management tool

- Developer(s): Jive Software
- Stable release: 9.0.7.1 / 2019-03-20[±]
- Operating system: Cross-platform
- Type: Knowledge management
- License: Proprietary
- Website: www.jivesoftware.com

Jive (formerly known as Clearspace, then Jive SBS, then Jive Engage) is a commercial Java EE-based Enterprise 2.0 collaboration and knowledge management tool produced by Jive Software. It was first released as "Clearspace" in 2006, then renamed SBS (for "Social Business Software") in March 2009, then renamed "Jive Engage" in 2011, and renamed simply to "Jive" in 2012.

Jive integrates the functionality of online communities, microblogging, social networking, discussion forums, blogs, wikis, and IM under one unified user interface. Content placed into any of the systems (blog, wiki, documentation, etc.) can be found through a common search interface. Other features include RSS capability, email integration, a reputation and reward system for participation, personal user profiles, JAX-WS web service interoperability, and integration with the Spring Framework.

The product is a pure-Java server-side web application and will run on any platform where Java (JDK 1.5 or higher) is installed. It does not require a dedicated server - users have reported successful deployment in both shared environments and multiple machine clusters.

As of Jive 8, released March 30, 2015, there is a Jive-n version which is for internal use (hosted by the consumer or hosted by Jive as a service) and a Jive-x version which is an external version hosted as a service. Jive no longer supports wiki markup language.

== Server requirements for Jive 8-n ==
The following are the server requirements for Jive 8-n

- Operating systems: RHEL version 6 or 7 for x86_64, CentOS version 6 or 7 for x86_64 or SuSE Enterprise Linux Server (SLES) 11 and 12 for x86_64
- Application Servers: Jive ships with its own embedded Apache HTTPD and Tomcat servers as part of the install package. It is not possible to deploy the application onto other appservers.
- Databases:
  - MySQL (5.1, 5.5, 5.6)
  - Oracle (11gR2, 12c)
  - Postgres (9.0, 9.1, 9.2, 9.3, 9.4 - 9.2 or higher recommended)
  - Microsoft SQL Server (2008R2, 2012, 2014)
- Environment:
  - Jive recommends a server with at least 4GB of RAM and a dual-core 2 GHz processor with x86_64 architecture
  - The product integrates with an LDAP repository or Active Directory
  - For optimal deployment with a large community Jive Software recommends:
    - using dedicated cache and document-conversion servers
    - hosting the application and database servers separately

== Releases ==
- Jive 8, released on March 30, 2015
- Jive 7, released in October 2013
- Jive 9.0.x, released in November 2016
- Jive 9, released in November 2016, supported now

== See also ==
- Comparison of wiki software
- List of wiki software
- Collaborative software
