= Confluence (software) =

Corporate collaboration software program

- Developer: Atlassian
- Release: 25 March 2004; 22 years ago
- Stable release: 8.5.2 / 4 October 2023; 2 years ago[±]
- Written in: Java
- Operating system: Android; iOS; Linux; Microsoft Windows
- Available in: English, Spanish, Simplified Chinese, Czech, Finnish, French, German, Russian, Swedish, Japanese, Norwegian, Polish
- Type: Wiki (Knowledge management software, Collaborative software)
- License: Proprietary
- Website: www.atlassian.com/software/confluence

Confluence is a web-based corporate wiki developed by Australian software company Atlassian. Atlassian wrote Confluence in the Java programming language and first published it in 2004. Confluence Standalone comes with a built-in Tomcat web server and hsql database, and also supports other databases.

The company markets Confluence as enterprise software, licensed as either on-premises software or software as a service running on AWS. In 2025, Atlassian announced intentions to discontinue supporting on-premise deployments by 2029.

== History ==
Atlassian released Confluence 1.0 on 25 March 2004, saying its purpose was to build "an application that was built to the requirements of an enterprise knowledge management system, without losing the essential, powerful simplicity of the wiki in the process."

In recent versions, Confluence has evolved into part of an integrated collaboration platform and has been adapted to work in conjunction with Jira and other Atlassian software products, including Bamboo, Clover, Crowd, Crucible, and Fisheye.

In 2014, Atlassian released Confluence Data Center to add high availability with load balancing across nodes in a clustered setup.

== Features ==
The book Social Media Marketing for Dummies in 2007 considered Confluence an "emergent enterprise social software" that was "becoming an established player." Wikis for Dummies described it as "one of the most popular wikis in corporate environments," "easy to set up and use," and "an exception to the rule" that wiki software search capabilities don't work well.

In 2011, eWeek cited new features in version 4 such as auto-formatting and auto-complete, unified wiki and WYSIWYG, social network notifications and drag and drop integration of multimedia files. Use cases include basic enterprise communication, collaboration workspaces for knowledge exchange, social networking, Personal Information Management and project management. The German newspaper Computerwoche from IDG Business Media compares it to Microsoft SharePoint and finds it "a good starting point" as a platform for social business collaboration, while SharePoint is better suited to companies with more structured processes.

Confluence includes setting up CSS templates for styles and formatting for all pages, including those imported from Word documents. Built in search allows queries by date, the page's author, and content type such as graphics.

The tool has add-ons for integration with standard formats, with a flexible programmable API allowing expansion. The software is relevant as an outline tool for requirements that can be linked to tasks in the Jira issue tracker by the same company.

== Discontinuation of wiki markup ==
As of version 4.0, in 2011, Confluence ended support for wiki markup language. This led to pushback by some previous versions' users who objected to the change. In response, Atlassian provided a source code editor as a plugin, which allows advanced users the ability to edit the underlying XHTML-based document source. The new source markup is XHTML-based, but it is not XHTML compliant.

Additionally, wiki markup can be typed into the editor, and Confluence's autocomplete and auto-format function converts the wiki markup to the new format. After the real-time conversion, content cannot be edited as wiki markup again.

== Security ==
Confluence Cloud data is encrypted in transit and at rest. In June 2022, Atlassian disclosed a zero-day vulnerability in Confluence Server allowing remote code execution, which had been present for over a decade.

In October 2023, Atlassian disclosed a critical broken access control vulnerability allowing exploitation remotely.

== See also ==
- Collaborative software
- Comparison of wiki software
- Comparison of wiki hosting services
- List of content management systems
- List of wiki software
