= CLiki =

Open source wiki application

- Stable release: 0.4.4 / May 28, 2005
- Repository: gitlab.common-lisp.net/vsedach/cliki2
- Type: Wiki software
- License: MIT
- Website: www.cliki.net

CLiki is an open source wiki application written in Common Lisp, that was under development from 2002 to 2005.

CLiki was first presented at the International Lisp Conference 2002. CLiki was the first wiki variant to introduce so called "free links", using the _(free link format) as an alternative to the much-criticized CamelCase.

The CLiki program is free software licensed under the MIT license. It runs under SBCL and uses the Araneida Common Lisp web server.

CLiki also operates a homepage using the software that is dedicated to the subject of Common Lisp.

== Cliki2 ==
Since 2011, a new version of Cliki (named Cliki2) was developed by Vladimir Sedach and Andrey Moskvitin, with major features around spam prevention. Other major features are:

- Araneida was replaced with Hunchentoot
- Real article deletion and undeletion
- Code coloring using cl-colorize
- Working list of uncategorized/orphan articles
- Pages that work well in text browsers (and hopefully screen readers)
