= ConnectedText =

Personal wiki for Windows

- Developer(s): Eduardo Mauro
- Stable release: 6.0.15.41 / July 8, 2016; 9 years ago
- Operating system: Microsoft Windows
- Type: Personal wiki
- License: Commercial
- Website: connectedtext.com

ConnectedText (also abbreviated as CT) is a personal wiki which runs on Windows. Articles are written in plain text in CT's own markup language. When viewing articles they are styled by a standard HTML CSS file. The markup language contains many directives for classification and linkage and can also be scripted using the Python programming language.

The development of ConnectedText has now ceased. The current version (6.0.15) will be the last. It is still on sale but the developer has said that there will be no new features added. The Official website and the product's forum are no longer accessible.

== Features ==
ConnectedText also features:

- Categories
- Outline view
- Semantic extensions
- Special date topics
- Plugins, to include:
  - Python scripting
  - Ploticus graphs
  - Graphviz charts
  - Sparklines
- Math formulas rendered using LaTeX
- Tables
- Drag and drop operations
- Clipboard catcher
- Version comparison
- Ability to display pages in a tree view, similar to Keynote
- Support to Asian code pages
- Ability to export the entire wiki to plain text, HTML or Microsoft Compressed HTML Help
- Support scripting languages (Python, Perl, VBScript, etc.)
- Support for USB drives
- Support several languages: English, Portuguese, Danish, Italian and German

== See also ==
- Personal wiki
