= Socialtext =

Company based in Palo Alto, California, United States

- Type: Private
- Founded: December 2002
- Headquarters: Palo Alto, California, USA
- Key people: Ross Mayfield (Founder); Eugene Lee (CEO) until 2012
- Website: www.socialtext.com

Socialtext Incorporated was a company based in Palo Alto, California, that produced enterprise social software for companies. It offered an integrated suite of wiki tools and social software applications, including microblogging, user profiles, directories and other collaboration tools. They also maintained mobile apps for individual tools.

The company was founded by Ross Mayfield and Peter Kaminski in 2002. Its investors included the Omidyar Network, Draper Fisher Jurvetson, Sapphire Ventures, and Bedford Funding. Their wiki and suite of tools, also called Socialtext, was open-sourced in 2006. As of 2019, a version of the suite was still available as a service of the Learning Technologies Group. However, updates on social media ended on 2016.

== Development ==
Socialtext's software stack was initially based on Brian Ingerson's perl library Kwiki. As of 2006, it was available as a hosted service, or as a standalone hardware appliance.

Starting in 2005, the company began releasing its wiki tools under an open source license, starting with its wikiwyg editor. In 2006, it partnered with Dan Bricklin to distribute his wiki spreadsheet tool, wikicalc. Audrey Tang consulted with them on their interaction design. The company also supported an ecosystem of open-source wiki developers, and ran a monthly Wiki Wednesdays salon for many years.

In 2010, Socialtext 4.0 offered LDAP and Active Directory integration, Single Sign-On, REST API, and connectors to Salesforce.com and SharePoint. The last major release was Socialtext 6.0, in 2014.

=== Acquisition and aftermath ===
In 2012, Socialtext was acquired by Bedford Funding, a private equity firm that also owned other enterprise social tools, including PeopleFluent, a tool for enterprise talent development. Socialtext became a subsidiary of PeopleFluent, and continued operating under its own name within the larger organization. In 2019, PeopleFluent was acquired by Learning Technologies Group.

== See also ==
- Social computing
- Comparison of wiki software
- List of collaborative software
