= Wiki hosting service =

Server hosting independent wikis

A wiki hosting service, or wiki farm, is a server or an array of servers that offers users tools to simplify the creation and development of individual, independent wikis.

Prior to wiki farms, someone who wanted to operate a wiki had to install the software and manage the server(s) themselves. With a wiki farm, the farm's administration installs the core wiki code once on its own servers, centrally maintains the servers, and establishes unique space on the servers for the content of each individual wiki with the shared core code executing the functions of each wiki.

Both commercial and non-commercial wiki farms are available for users and online communities. While most of the wiki farms allow anyone to open their own wiki, some impose restrictions. Many wiki farm companies generate revenue through the insertion of advertisements, but often allow payment of a monthly fee as an alternative to accepting ads.

Fandom, created by Jimmy Wales and Angela Beesley Starling in 2004 and formerly known as Wikicities and Wikia, is a well-known example of a wiki-hosting service.

== Comparison of wiki hosting services ==
This comparison of wiki hosting services or wiki farms is not comprehensive, it details only those 'notable' enough (in Wikipedia terms) to be included. A useful comprehensive comparison of wiki farms can be found on MediaWiki's site, at mw:Hosting services.

Online services which host wiki-style editable web pages. General characteristics of cost, presence of advertising, licensing are compared, as are technical differences in editing, features, wiki engine, multilingual support and syntax support.

This table compares general information for several of the more than 100 wiki hosting services that exist.

All the mentioned services have WYSIWYG editing.

Wiki hosting services
Hosting service	Start	Cost	Ad supported	Content license	Subdomain	Custom themes	Download, backup	Other Features	Base wiki engine	Language	Syntax support
Confluence	2004	Non-free (Note: Confluence has no free hosted option, but offers free software for charitable nonprofits and open source projects.)	?		No	?	?	Plugins, SSL, file storage, permissioning, WebDAV.			WYSIWYG Rich-text editor script plugin No formulas
Central Desktop	2005	Non-free	?		No	?	?	Access control, full-text search, calendaring, single sign-on to multiple projects, project templates, RSS enabled.	[?] (custom)		HTML, CSS/templating; No formulas
Ourproject.org	2002	Free	No	Copyleft (choice of Creative Commons, GNU FDL, other licenses)	Yes	?	?	Mailing lists, FTP, SSH, ddbb, email alias, backups, CVS/SVN, forums, task management.	MoinMoin by default; custom supported	Supports English, Spanish, French, and many other languages.	
PBworks	2005	Non-free	No		Yes	Yes	?	No page limits, SSL, RSS & Atom, email notifications, file management, page access settings.	[?] (custom)		All HTML, JavaScript, LaTeX formulas
Fandom	2004	Free	Yes	Creative Commons	Yes, but not for multilingual wikis	Yes	Yes	Common login and common preferences to all wikis of FANDOM for the same user. Blog, User Page, and User Talk pages for users.	MediaWiki	All languages Wikipedia supports (and some more); Community Support in English, Chinese, German, Japanese, Spanish, Portuguese, Italian, French and several other languages.	Wikitext as used by MediaWiki, Some HTML, JavaScript, Math formula, Lua
Miraheze	2015	Free	No	Creative Commons	Yes	Yes	Yes	Common login, custom extensions and skins and custom domains	MediaWiki	All languages Wikipedia supports (and some more)	WYSIWYG Rich-text editor script plugin
Wikidot	2006	Free	No	?	Yes	Yes	?	?	?	All languages Wikipedia supports (and some more)	Wikitext as used by MediaWiki, Some HTML, JavaScript, Math formula, Lua

=== Deprecated wiki hosts ===
This section is for hosts that were previously in the list above but no longer available:

- Wikispaces
