= PukiWiki =

Cross-platform wiki software

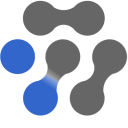
- Developer(s): PukiWiki Development Team
- Initial release: 15 July 2002; 22 years ago
- Stable release: 1.5.4 / 30 March 2022; 3 years ago
- Repository: github.com/pukiwiki/pukiwiki
- Written in: PHP
- Platform: Cross-platform
- Size: ~0.4 MB (compressed)
- Available in: English and Japanese
- Type: Wiki software
- License: GPLv2+
- Website: pukiwiki.sourceforge.io

PukiWiki is wiki software written in PHP, and is widely used by Japanese wikis. It was forked from YukiWiki, originally developed by Yuuki Hiroshi. Since version 1.4, PukiWiki Development Team became the developer of the software.

== Features ==
Originating from Japan, PuwiWiki offers better DBCS support than most wiki software. It also has a layout optimized for mobile use since many use their phones to browse wikis in Japan.

PukiWiki can run on PHP 4, 5, 7 or 8. It supports interwiki links and extensions, similar to MediaWiki.

PukiWiki is written such that it uses PHP with a series of text files, hence does not require a database to operate, and does not support databases natively. However, support could be added through extensions for MySQL, SQLite, Oracle Oci8 and PostgreSQL.

== Derivative Versions ==
- xpWiki - Developed by nao-pon and forked from PukiWiki version 1.4.7, and aims at integration with XOOPS.
- PukiWiki Mod - Also developed by nao-pon with the same goal, but forked from version 1.3.x instead.
- PukiWiki Plus! - Derivative version with enhanced localization features.
  - PukiWiki Advance - Forked from PukiWiki Plus!.
- PyukiWiki - Derivative version written in Perl.
