= MindTouch =

MindTouch Responsive

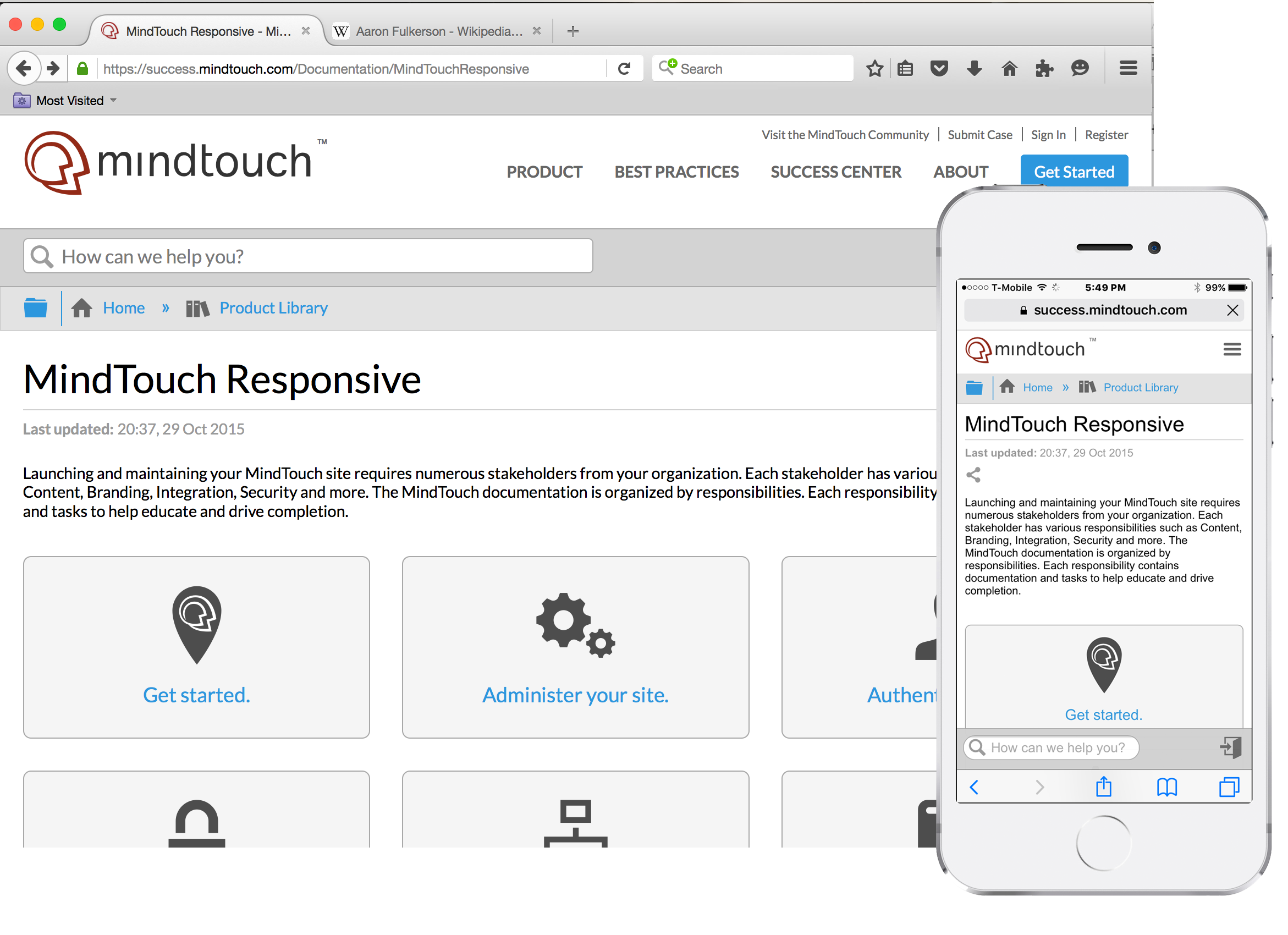
- MindTouch Responsive default out of box experience
- Developers: MindTouch, Inc.
- Release: May 2015; 11 years ago
- Type: Content management system, customer relationship management
- License: Proprietary software as a service
- Website: mindtouch.com

MindTouch was an American multinational technology company headquartered in San Diego, California, that designed, developed, and sold SaaS computer software and online services. MindTouch was founded by Aaron Fulkerson and Steve Bjorg in 2005. In January 2016, MindTouch announced their Series A Venture Capital funding round, totaling US$12 million. PeakSpan Capital led the round with participation from SK Ventures and SAP SE. In April 2021, MindTouch was acquired by NICE CXone and rebranded NICE CXone Expert.

As a division of NICE, the organization's primary software product is NICE CXone Expert (formerly called MindTouch Responsive). Retired products included DekiWiki, MindTouch Core, and MindTouch 4. NICE CXone Expert allows for a team to create, publish, and edit content, and then structure that content within a responsive user interface. Its online services include TouchPoints, CRM integrations, a Success Program, and a custom software development team that helps with branding, information architecture, and custom integrations for new and existing customers.

== History ==
=== Wiki front-end ===
MindTouch started in 2005 as a fork of the MediaWiki software. The first release was named DekiWiki, and occurred in July 2006. Its features included use of XHTML in place of wikitext, a WYSIWYG editor, and Lucene-based search. The main functionality of the MindTouch wiki was to access a PHP frontend, which provided a wiki along with a WYSIWYG editor.

Multi-language support (named polyglot) allows switching interface and content languages on per page, per section, and per user basis. In multilingual wikis the engine prioritizes search results by the user's default language. MindTouch cites the 8.05 release of Deki as the first polyglot application on the web.

MindTouch Core

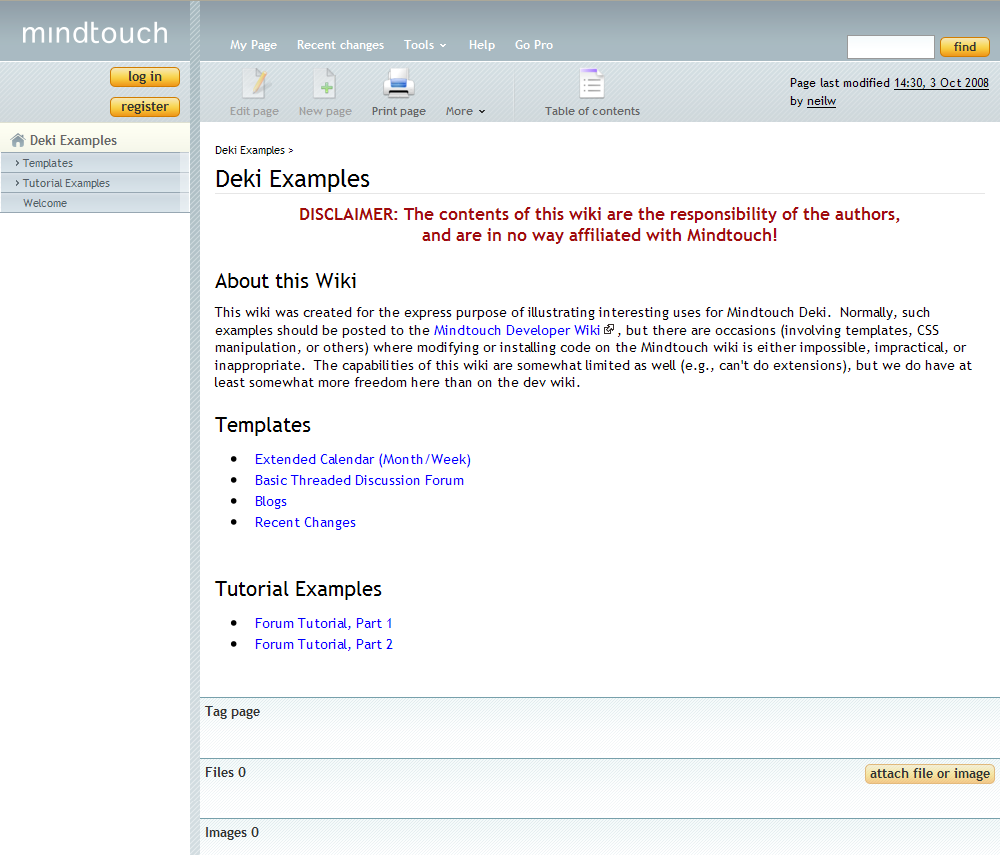
- MindTouch Core using the Fiesta theme
- Developers: MindTouch, Inc. and community contributors
- Release: July 2006; 20 years ago
- Final release: 10.1.4 / January 22, 2013; 13 years ago
- Written in: PHP, C#
- Platform: .NET Framework or Mono
- Type: Wiki
- License: GPL
- Website: mindtouch.com

=== MindTouch Core ===
MindTouch Core allows for a user to access and edit pages stored as XML, rather than wikitext. MindTouch Core is an open-source enterprise web-based wiki software and mashup platform. Pages are editable using a GUI editor or may be manipulated as an XML web service. The software has integrated authentication with Apache or IIS modules. Permissions can be applied to individual pages or page hierarchies. The open source version MindTouch Core is distributed on SourceForge under the terms of the GNU General Public License (with some parts under GNU Lesser General Public License and Apache License). DekiScript, a lightweight, interpreted programming language, allows users to add dynamic content to MindTouch pages. DekiScript may be embedded directly into web pages and extended through XML extensions.

MindTouch Core includes multiple connectors to perform mashups. MindTouch Core also includes with extensions allowing connection to numerous online services, including systems such as Google Maps, Windows Live, Flickr and Yahoo. A now unsupported commercial license enabled features such as connectors to SugarCRM, Salesforce, LinkedIn, MySQL, Microsoft SQL Server and Microsoft Access.

On April 9, 2013, MindTouch Inc. announced that they would no longer support their open source offering MindTouch Core. The last open-source releases of MindTouch Core are still available on SourceForge.

=== MindTouch 4 ===
MindTouch 4 was a SaaS product developed from the open-source MindTouch Core source code base.

=== NICE CXone Expert ===
NICE CXone Expert is the current version of the software service. NICE CXone Expert allows for a team to create, publish, and edit content, and then structure that content within a responsive user interface.

=== Partners ===
Integration partnerships with CRM vendors such as SAP and Salesforce.com provide support agents the ability to use NICE CXone Expert content in their customer support workflows.

=== Releases ===
NICE CXone Expert's cloud infrastructure delivers a weekly update for bug fixes and feature changes.

=== Development ===
MindTouch was forked from MediaWiki in 2005; the first release (under the name DekiWiki) occurred in July 2006, featuring XHTML in place of wikitext, a WYSIWYG editor and Lucene-based search. Consequently, the backend was completely reimplemented in C#, resulting in an API built as web services on top of the new DReAM ("Distributed REST Application Manager") server and toolset. NICE CXone Expert is the latest version of the organization's SaaS offering, replacing MindTouch 4. MindTouch 4 was forked, internally within MindTouch, Inc., from the open-source MindTouch Core source code base in early 2010. In addition to some legacy PHP and C# components of MindTouch Core, NICE CXone Expert software and infrastructure includes technologies such as NodeJS, Elasticsearch, F#, Amazon SQS, Amazon Lambda, Snowflake, Redis, HAProxy, Puppet, Docker, and Kubernetes.
