= Swiki =

Swiki (Squeak wiki) is wiki software written in Squeak. It was formerly used by the Georgia Institute of Technology's College of Computing, but its use was discontinued in 2011 following a student complaint about privacy. Swiki comes bundled with its own web server.

A swiki installation consists of the Virtual Machine (VM) file (usually squeak.exe), an image file (usually squeak.image), and a set of files and folders with templates and the virtual wikis. One swiki installation allows a large number of virtual wikis to be created through the admin interface using a web browser. The image file and associated templates and virtual wikis can be run on any OS as long as the VM for that OS is used.

The VM and image file are the only binary files. All of the swiki templates and pages are stored as text files using XML tags. Each new virtual swiki goes in its own folder, and each page in the virtual swiki is a numbered XML file. For example, the first page is 1.xml, the second is 2.xml, etc. History for each page is a separate XML file that used the file extension "old", e.g., 1.old, 2.old.

== See also ==
- Comparison of wiki software
