= Pound (networking) =

Reverse proxy software

- Developers: Apsis GmbH (to 3.0e); Sergei Poznyakoff (4.x)
- Stable release: 4.17 / July 29, 2025; 15 months ago
- Written in: C
- Operating system: Unix
- Type: open-source
- License: GPL
- Website: github.com/graygnuorg/pound

Pound is a lightweight open source reverse proxy program and application firewall suitable to be used as a web server load balancing solution. Originally developed by an IT security company, it has a strong emphasis on security. The original intent on developing Pound was to allow distributing the load among several Zope servers running on top of ZEO (Zope Extensible Object). However, Pound is not limited to Zope-based installations. Using regular expression matching on the requested URLs, Pound can pass different kinds of requests to different backend server groups. A few more of its most important features:

- detects when a backend server fails or recovers, and bases its load balancing decisions on this information: if a backend server fails, it will not receive requests until it recovers
- decrypts https requests to http ones
- IPv6 support
- can load balance from IPv6 clients to IPv4 servers and vice versa
- rejects incorrect requests
- can be used in a chroot environment
- has no special requirements concerning which web server software or browser to use
- supports virtual hosts
- Server Name Indication (SNI) for SSL/TLS certificate negotiation
- configurable

Pound is distributed under the terms of the GNU General Public License and can be used free of charge even in business environments.

== See also ==
- Apache Traffic Server
- Web accelerator which discusses host-based HTTP acceleration
- Proxy server which discusses client-side proxies
- Reverse proxy which discusses origin-side proxies
- Comparison of web server software
- Internet Cache Protocol
