= SamePage =

SamePage is an enterprise wiki application written in Java with a WYSIWYG user interface. Developed and marketed by eTouch Systems, SamePage is sold as a hosted/Software as a service (SaaS) or on-premises software for collaboration and knowledge management. It is not open-source.

SamePage is a scalable and dynamic wiki that enables its users to collaborate online, share knowledge and company information and communicate in a secure, well-supported online environment.

SamePage is used by medium and large enterprises around the world, including Alcatel-Lucent, NASA, Citrix, Hestia, Teradyne, Siemens, NY State Unified Court System and Loyola Marymount University (LMU).

SamePage is supported in a strategic partnership with Cisco/WebEx and has additional distribution channels via Etelos. In April 2009, it became the first enterprise wiki available on the Force.com AppExchange from salesforce.com.

SamePage features do not include a wiki syntax nor does it provide dynamic topic linking.

On April 26, 2011, eTouch released version 4.4 of SameTouch.
