= PBworks =

Wiki software company

- Type: Private
- Founded: May 30, 2005
- Headquarters: San Mateo, California, U.S.
- Key people: David Weekly, Founder; Jim Groff, CEO
- Products: A free/premium hosted workspace service which allows collaborative editing of pages and files
- Number of employees: 30
- Website: www.pbworks.com

PBworks (formerly PBwiki) is a commercial real-time collaborative editing (RTCE) system created by David Weekly, with Ramit Sethi and Nathan Schmidt, who joined shortly thereafter as co-founders. Based in San Mateo, California, United States, the company operates on a freemium basis, offering basic features free of charge and more advanced features for a fee.

PBworks' investors include Mohr Davidow Ventures and the Seraph Group, as well as angel investors Ron Conway and Chris Yeh.

== History ==
In 2005, David Weekly began developing software to build privately hosted wikis through a website, which he named "PeanutButterWiki". The company's original name stems from the concept that "making a wiki is as easy as making a peanut butter sandwich". The original beta test of PBworks was released for public comment on May 31, 2005.

The site was formally launched in June 2005. In early 2008, the company launched PBworks 2.0, an improved version with a new layout, more granular security, and a more easily customizable color scheme. PBworks also launched a Mobile Edition in early 2009.

In June 2008, the company hired Jim Groff, a former employee of Oracle Corporation and Apple Inc., as its new CEO. David Weekly, the former CEO, remains its Chief Product Officer and Chairman.

As of 2008, PBworks contains over 6.91 million pages of user content.

In 2014, the team behind PBworks began development of its next-generation product, Dokkio.

== Software ==
PBworks is hosted on an all-Linux cluster and uses its own proprietary software. In early 2007, it added WYSIWYG editing, and in 2008, limited HTML source editing. Since 2009, the wiki is entirely HTML based, and original wiki markup language is no longer supported.

Users can create free basic wiki workspaces or upgrade to a premium plan to access additional features, such as enhanced security features, customization through CSS, and more storage space. Workspaces can be configured as either public or private (only viewable by those who have been invited to join the workspace).

The software is only available in English.

== Usage ==
A number of businesses and corporations use PBworks to create private wikis for employees; one case study described a legal firm which had transitioned to PBworks as a document management system in order to cut their IT costs. Major companies using PBworks to host internal documents include CafePress.com, Capgemini, Deloitte, Financial Times, Kiva, and Wideload Games. Many educational groups and educators use PBworks, too, including DePaul University, the National Opinion Research Center at the University of Chicago, the University of Toronto, the University of Wisconsin–Madison, and Wayne State University.

== Name change ==
On April 28, 2009, PBwiki changed its name to PBworks (and at the same time launched a new Legal Edition).

== See also ==
- Comparison of wiki software
