= Situational application =

In computing, a situational application is "good enough" software created for a narrow group of users with a unique set of needs. The application typically (but not always) has a short life span, and is often created within the group where it is used, sometimes by the users themselves. As the requirements of a small team using the application change, the situational application often also continues to evolve to accommodate these changes. Although situational applications are specifically designed to embrace change, significant changes in requirements may lead to an abandonment of the situational application altogether – in some cases it is just easier to develop a new one than to evolve the one in use.

== Characteristics ==
Situational applications are developed fast, easy to use, uncomplicated, and serve a unique set of requirements. They have a narrow focus on a specific business problem, and they are written in a way where if the business problem changes rapidly, so can the situational application.

This contrasts with more common enterprise applications, which are designed to address a large set of business problems, require meticulous planning, and impose a sometimes-slow and often-meticulous change process.

== Origination ==
Clay Shirky in his essay entitled "Situated Software" described a type of software that "...is designed for use by a specific social group, rather than for a generic set of "users"." IBM later morphed the term into "situational applications".

== Evolution ==
The successful large-scale implementation of a situational application environment in an organization requires a strategy, mindset, methodology and support structure quite different from traditional application development. This is now evolving as more companies learn how to best leverage the ideas behind situational applications. In addition, the advent of cloud-based application development and deployment platforms makes the implementation of a comprehensive situational application environment much more feasible.

== Examples ==
A structured wiki that can host wiki applications lends itself to creation of situational applications. Some mashups can also be considered situational applications. A forms application such as a Microsoft Access Database (MDB file) can be considered a situational application.

The latest implementations of situational application environments include Longjump, Force.com and WorkXpress.

== See also ==
- End user development
- Mashup (web application hybrid)
- Wiki application
