= Glogster =

SaaS platform

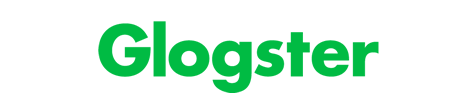
- Website type: Interactive Learning, Online Education
- Available in: English, Spanish, Czech
- Headquarters: Czech Republic
- Website: www.glogster.com
- Launched: 2009; 17 years ago
- Current status: Shutdown, January 2024

Glogster was a cloud-based (SaaS) platform for creating web posters and presentations. The platform allowed users to combine text, images, video, and audio to create an interactive, web-based poster called glogs on a virtual canvas. The platform was available as both a free and a paid premium service.

== History ==
Glogster.com was launched in 2007. This platform was initially promoted as a visual network, allowing users to express themselves via “graphic blogs” or “glogs”. Glogster EDU was used as a learning and teaching tool in place of traditional poster assignments to foster higher order thinking skill. The platform was used in classrooms to develop necessary competences such as curiosity, critical and systematized thinking, information literacy, and social responsibility.

The platform was available on desktop. In 2014, the company released mobile applications for iOS and Android.

The regular Glogster.com, the social network platform, was closed for new registrations and account access ceased in Feb 2015. After this the company focused solely on the Glogster EDU platform. There is, however, a personal type license available for single users. The platform has grown into a worldwide community in over 200 countries, with over 1.9 million teacher accounts with over 17 million student accounts who have created more than 25 million educational glogs, out of 45 million total glogs on the service.

in August 2022, Glogster suspended all services provided due to "operational reasons". The website remained in that state until January 2024, when the website was taken down.

== Contests, collaboration and partnerships ==
In 2016, 2017 & 2018 Glogster was the tool used for the NASA Spinoff Promotion And Research Challenge - OPSPARC. The aim of the challenge was for students to create NASA inspired spinoff ideas and show them by creating a "Glog", an online multimedia poster via Glogster. There were three levels of the competition: the Elementary School Category for students grades 3–6; the Middle School Category for students grades 7-8; and the High School Category for students grades 9–12. Students were instructed to research spinoffs found in their homes or schools, and just like an engineer, use an engineering design process to take an everyday object and use it in new ways that will solve a problem learning invaluable STEM inspired skills. Students would show off their work by using videos, drawings, pictures and text and submitting them in the form of a Glog.
