= History of wikis =

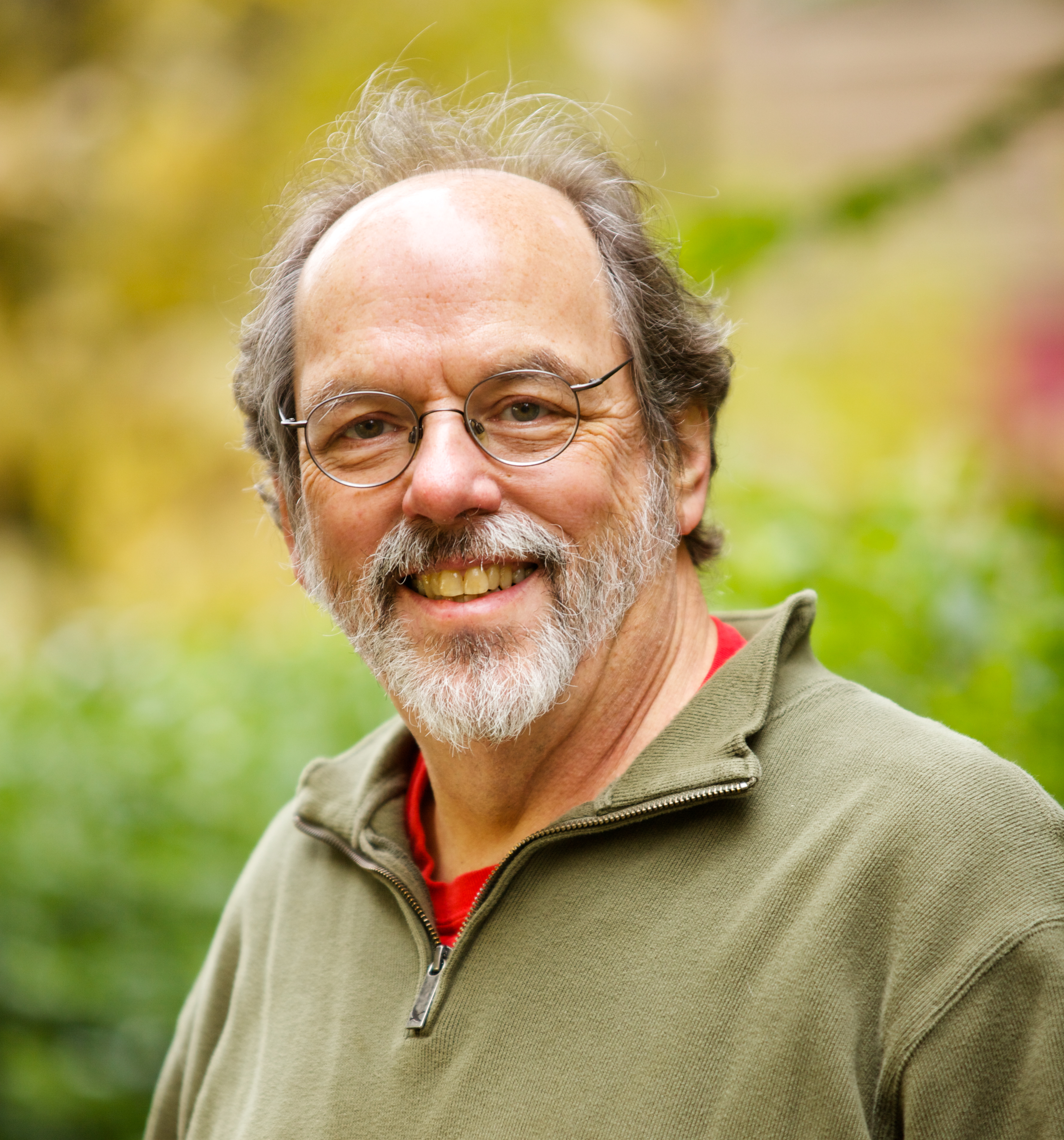
Ward Cunningham, the developer of the first wiki software, WikiWikiWeb

In 1994, Ward Cunningham gave the name "WikiWikiWeb" to the knowledge base which ran on his company's website at c2.com, and the wiki software that powered it. The wiki went public in March 1995, the date used in anniversary celebrations of the wiki's origins. c2.com is thus the first true wiki, or a website with pages and links that can be easily edited via the browser, with a reliable version history for each page. He chose "WikiWikiWeb" as the name based on his memories of the "Wiki Wiki Shuttle" at Honolulu International Airport, and because "wiki" is the Hawaiian word for "quick".

Wiki software has some conceptual origins in the version control and hypertext systems used for documentation and software in the 1980s, and some actualized origins in the 1970s "Journal" feature of NLS. Its distant ancestors include Vannevar Bush's proposed "memex" system in 1945, the collaborative hypertext database ZOG in 1972, the NoteCards system from Xerox, the Apple hypertext system HyperCard. As was typical of these earlier systems, Cunningham's motive was technical: to facilitate communication between software developers.

Many alternative wiki applications and websites appeared over the next five years. In the meantime, the first wiki, now known as "WardsWiki", evolved as features were added to the software and as the growing body of users developed a unique "wiki culture". By 2000, WardsWiki had developed a great deal of content outside its original stated purpose, which led to the spinoff of content into sister sites, most notably MeatballWiki.

The website Wikipedia, a free content encyclopedia, was launched in January 2001, and quickly became the most popular wiki, which it remains to this day. Its rise in popularity (it was in the top ten most popular sites in 2007) played a large part in introducing wikis to the general public. There now exist at least hundreds of thousands of wiki websites, and they have become increasingly prevalent in corporations and other organizations.

== Hypertext editing: pre-1994 ==
A distant precursor of the wiki concept was Vannevar Bush's vision of the "memex", a microfilm reader which would create automated links between documents. In a 1945 essay in Atlantic Monthly titled "As We May Think", Bush described an imaginary future user interface: "Before him are the two items to be joined, projected onto adjacent viewing positions... The user taps a single key, and the items are permanently joined... Thereafter, at any time, when one of these items is in view, the other can be instantly recalled merely by tapping a button below the corresponding code space. Moreover, when numerous items have been thus joined together to form a trail, they can be reviewed in turn..." This vision, though it has been described as predicting the World Wide Web, resembles wikis more than the web in one important way: the system being described is self-contained, not a loose network.

In 1972 Kristo Ivanov published a PhD dissertation on Quality-control of information, containing a theoretical basis for what corresponds to the wiki-idea, in terms of systemic social interaction. Information turns into knowledge as a net of contributions and negotiations converge about a core concept, or entity. The emphasis is on a dynamically documented "agreement in the context of maximum possible disagreement", which is akin to the discussions in talk pages and the results of view history of Wikipedia.

=== Pre-World-Wide-Web hypertext systems ===
An indirect precursor of the wiki concept was the ZOG multi-user database system, developed in 1972 by researchers at Carnegie-Mellon University. The ZOG interface consisted of text-only frames, each containing a title, a description, a line with standard ZOG commands, and a set of selections (hypertext links) leading to other frames.

Two members of the ZOG team, Donald McCracken and Robert Akscyn, spun off a company from CMU in 1981 and developed an improved version of ZOG called Knowledge Management System (KMS). KMS was a collaborative tool based on direct manipulation, permitting users to modify the contents of frames, freely intermixing text, graphics and images, any of which could be linked to other frames. Because the database was distributed and accessible from any workstation on a network, changes became visible immediately to other users, enabling them to work concurrently on shared structures (documents, programs, ...).

Three notable hypertext-based systems emerged in the 1980s, that may have been inspired by ZOG, KMS and/or one another: the NoteCards system, developed in 1984 and released by Xerox in 1985; Janet Walker's Symbolics Document Examiner, created in 1985 for the operation manuals of Symbolics computers; and Bill Atkinson's WildCard application, on which he began work in 1985, and which was released in 1987 as HyperCard. Ward Cunningham has stated, that the wiki idea was influenced by his experience using HyperCard: he was shown the software by fellow programmer Kent Beck, before its official release (it was still called "WildCard" at the time), and, in his words, was "blown away" by it.

Cunningham used HyperCard to make a stack holding three kinds of information: ideas, people who hold ideas, and projects where people share ideas. (He would later use this same architecture for the Patterns, People and Projects listed on the front page of his original wiki, the WikiWikiWeb.) Cunningham made a single card that would serve for all uses. It had three fields: Name, Description and Links. Cunningham configured the system so that links could be created to cards that did not exist yet; creating such a link would in turn create a new blank card.

=== The World Wide Web ===
In 1990, Tim Berners-Lee of CERN built the first hypertext client, which he called World Wide Web (it was also a Web editor), and the first hypertext server (info.cern.ch). In 1991 he posted a short summary of the World Wide Web project on the alt.hypertext newsgroup, marking the debut of the Web as a publicly available service on the Internet.

Early adopters of the World Wide Web were primarily university-based scientific departments or physics laboratories. In May 1992 appeared ViolaWWW, a graphical browser providing features such as embedded graphics, scripting, and animation. However, the turning point for the World Wide Web was the introduction of the Mosaic graphical browser in 1993, which gained wide popularity due to its strong support of integrated multimedia. In April 1993, CERN agreed that anyone could use the Web protocol and code for free.

== WikiWikiWeb and the birth of wikis: 1994–2001 ==
=== WikiWikiWeb, the first wiki ===
Ward Cunningham started developing the WikiWikiWeb in 1994 as a supplement to the Portland Pattern Repository, a website containing documentation about software design patterns, a particular approach to object-oriented programming.

The WikiWikiWeb was intended as a collaborative database, in order to make the exchange of ideas between programmers easier; it was dedicated to "People, Projects and Patterns". Cunningham wrote the software to run it using the Perl programming language. He considered calling the software "quick-web", but instead named it using the Hawaiian word "wiki-wiki", which means "quick-quick" or "very quick", based on his memory of the Wiki Wiki Shuttle at Honolulu International Airport.

Cunningham installed a prototype of the software on his company Cunningham & Cunningham's website c2.com. When the site was functioning, Cunningham sent the following email to a colleague:

Steve – I've put up a new database on my web server and I'd like you to take a look. It's a web of people, projects and patterns accessed through a cgi-bin script. It has a forms-based authoring capability that doesn't require familiarity with html. I'd be very pleased if you would get on and at least enter your name in RecentVisitors. I'm asking you because I think you might also add some interesting content. I'm going to advertise this a little more widely in a week or so. The URL is http://c2.com/cgi-bin/wiki. Thanks and best regards

— Ward Cunningham,

Cunningham dates the official start of WikiWikiWeb as March 25, 1995. On May 1, 1995, he sent an email about the website to a number of programmers, which caused an increase in participation. This note was posted to the "Patterns" listserv, a group of software developers gathered under the name "The Hillside Group" to develop Erich Gamma's use of object-oriented patterns. Cunningham had noticed that the older contents of the listserv tended to get buried under the more recent posts, and he proposed instead to collect ideas in a set of pages which would be collectively edited. Cunningham's post stated: "The plan is to have interested parties write web pages about the People, Projects and Patterns that have changed the way they program." He added: "Think of it as a moderated list where anyone can be moderator and everything is archived. It's not quite a chat, still, conversation is possible."

The site was immediately popular within the pattern community.

=== CamelCase and internal links ===
Among Cunningham's innovations in creating WikiWikiWeb was the ability to easily link internally between pages, something that was often cumbersome to do in previous intranet and document management systems. Cunningham's solution to this was to automatically link any text expressed in CamelCase, including text for which a corresponding page did not yet exist.

This CamelCase convention was used by most wiki software for the first few years of wikis' existence. In 2001, the software UseModWiki, which at the time was in use on Wikipedia, switched to allow internal links to be done using standard spelling and double square bracket instead, in order to improve Wikipedia's usability. This square bracket syntax has since become more of a default convention for internal links within wiki software in general.

=== Release of the Wiki Base software ===
Ward Cunningham wrote a version of his wiki software meant for public usage, called "Wiki Base". In his announcement, he wrote: "WikiWikiWeb is almost public. Actually, a pretty good clone of it is public at: https://web.archive.org/web/20030801073834/http://c2.com/cgi/wikibase. I've translated almost all of the actual wiki script into HyperPerl, a wiki-literate programming system that I think you will like." Visitors were requested to register on the wiki before they took the Wiki Base code. Cunningham expected users to fold changes back into his editable version, but those who implemented changes generally chose to distribute the modified versions on their own sites.

Alternate applications for wikis began to emerge, usually imitating the look-and-feel of WikiWikiWeb/Wiki Base; such applications were originally known as "WikiWikiClones". The first one was most likely created by IBM programmer Patrick Mueller, who wrote his in the REXX language, even before Wiki Base was released.

=== Early wiki websites for software development ===
Inspired by the example of the WikiWikiWeb, programmers soon started several other wikis to build knowledge bases about programming topics. Wikis became popular in the free and open-source software (FOSS) community, where they were used for collaboratively discussing and documenting software. However, being used only by specialists, these early software-focused wikis failed to attract widespread public attention.

=== Growth and innovations in WikiWikiWeb from 1995 to 2000 ===
The WikiWikiWeb website approximately doubled in size every year 1995 to 2000, with disk usage rising from around 2 megabytes in 1995 to around 60 megabytes at the end of 2000. During that time, various innovations were put in place, many suggested by users, to help with navigation and editing. These included:

- 1995 – RecentVisitors, PeopleIndex: pages to help users know who was contributing
- 1995 – NotSoRecentChanges: excess lines from the RecentChanges page were (manually) copied to a file of "ChangesIn<Month>"
- 1996 – EditCopy: offers the possibility to edit the backup copy of a page (this was replaced in 2002 with Page History)
- 1996 – ThreadMode: the form of a page where community members hold a discussion, each signing their own contribution
- 1996 – WikiCategories: categories can be added as an automatic index to pages
- 1997 – RoadMaps: proposed lists of pages to consult about specific topics, such as the Algorithms RoadMap or the Leadership RoadMap
- 1999 – ChangeSummary: an aid for telling which changes added interesting new content and which were only minor
- 2000 – UserName: the Wiki will accept a cookie that specifies a User Name to be used in place of the host name (IP identity) in the RecentChanges log

"ThreadMode" was defined as "a form of discussion where our community holds a conversation". It consists of a series of signed comments added down the page in chronological order. Ward Cunningham generally frowned on ThreadMode, writing: "Chronological is only one of many possible organizations of technical writing and rarely the best one at that."

Cunningham encouraged contributors to "refactor" (rewrite) the ThreadMode discussions into DocumentMode discourse. In practice many pages started out at the top in DocumentMode and degenerated into ThreadMode further down. When ThreadMode became incomprehensible the result was called "ThreadMess". (In most modern wikis the conflict between these two modes has been resolved by putting all document text on the main page of an article, and all discussion text on a talk page.)

The use of categories was proposed by user Stan Silver on August 27, 1996. His initial post suggested: "If everyone adds a category and topic to their page, then the category and topic pages themselves can be used as automatic indexes into the pages." Initially Silver had proposed both categories and topics: categories denoted the specific nature of the page's subject (a book, a person, a pattern), while topics denoted the theme of the page (Java, extreme programming, Smalltalk). However, people ignored this separation, and topics were collapsed into the categories.

The "ChangeSummary" option began as an aid for telling which changes added interesting new content, and which were just minor adjustments of spelling, punctuation, or correction of web links. It started when some users began taking the RecentChanges page, annotating each line with a brief description of each change, and posting the result to the ChangeSummary page. This practice was highly time-consuming and rapidly petered out, but was replaced by the "MinorEdit/RecentEdits" feature, designed to reduce the RecentChanges clutter.

=== Tensions within WikiWikiWeb and the creation of sister sites ===
Between early 1998 and the end of 2000 participation in WikiWikiWeb snowballed, and the disk space consumed by wiki pages more than quadrupled. With increased participation tensions began to appear.

In 1998 proponents of Extreme Programming showed up on the site and started posting comments about Extreme Programming on most of the pages related to software development. This annoyed a number of people who wanted to talk about patterns, leading to the tag "XpFreeZone", which was put onto pages as a request not to talk about ExtremeProgramming on that page. Eventually most of the DesignPatterns people left to discuss patterns on their own wikis, and WikiWikiWeb began to be referred to as "WardsWiki" instead of the "PortlandPatternRepository".

Around the summer of 1999, user Sam Gentile posted the comment "I'm through here" on his user page, and began systematically removing his text from all pages on WikiWikiWeb that he had contributed to. Gentile worked at Microsoft and had been hurt by what he perceived as anti-Microsoft bias on WikiWikiWeb. His deletions led to controversy about whether he had the right to remove his own material, and whether others had the right to put it back in (which some began to do). This event became referred to as the "WikiMindWipe".

In April 2000, four WikiWikiWeb users independently tried to reduce the amount of text on the site via a large number of deletions. They mainly tried to delete material that was related to wikis and not software design patterns. They considered this material to be dead weight, and would have preferred to see it all replaced by concise guidance to newcomers. Contributors who disagreed with these deletions began copying all of the deleted text back in again. A vote was taken on the issue, and it was proposed that any major reductions should be pre-announced, with an opportunity for response before action was taken.

The longer-term result of the deletions was the formation of WikiWikiWeb "sister sites" later in 2000. Sunir Shah created a wiki called MeatballWiki, intended strictly for wiki-based documentation and discussions. A few months later, Richard Drake created the WhyClublet (or "Why?") wiki to host discussion of Christian issues, and Peter Merel created GreenCheeseWiki and The Reform Society to host, respectively, whimsical and political pages. Earle Martin subsequently created a catch-all for C2 off-topic pages called TheAdjunct. Many pages were moved from WikiWikiWeb to these alternative sites, with a stub of the moved page left on the WikiWikiWeb, containing a link to the new page and the message "This page exists only on SisterSites."

In 2001, Cunningham and user Bo Leuf published a book, The Wiki Way, which distilled the lessons learned during the collective experience of the first wiki.

=== Other wiki websites, 1999–2000 ===
While many early wiki websites were devoted to the development of open source software, one early wiki was created by the FoxPro user community. The FoxPro Wiki was founded in 1999 by Steven Black and evolved into a popular site with many pages.

World66 was a Dutch company which tried to transform the open content idea into a profitable business. The website was founded in 1999 by Richard and Douwe Osinga, and contains travel-related articles covering destinations around the world.

A wiki forum was created in 1999 for discussion of the newly created PhpWiki software. This became one of the larger software-related wikis. Sensei's Library, a wiki dedicated to discussion of the game of Go, was created by Morten G. Pahle and Arno Hollosi in October 2000. For its first few years of operation, it was one of the largest and most active wikis outside Wikipedia.

=== Other wiki applications, 1997–2000 ===
Clones of the WikiWikiWeb software began to be developed as soon as Ward Cunningham made the Wiki Base software available online. One of the early clones was CvWiki, developed in 1997 by Peter Merel, which was the first wiki application to have functioning transclusion, backlinks, and "WayBackMode".

JWiki (short for JavaWiki), released in 1997, was the first implementation of WikiWikiWeb in the Java language, and the first to be back-ended by a database. It was developed by Ricardo Clements, a former co-worker of Cunningham's.

Another early wiki engine was JosWiki, developed by an international group of Java programmers who were trying to create a free and open "Java Operating System" (JOS).

TWiki was created in Perl by Peter Thoeny in 1998, based on JosWiki. TWiki was aimed at large corporate intranets. It stored data in plain text files instead of in a database.

PikiPiki was created by Martin Pool in 1999 as a rewrite of WikiWikiWeb in Python. It was made to be a small program, using flat files and doing away with versioning (Pool felt that a wiki is not meant to be a document-management system).

PhpWiki, created by Steve Wainstead in 1999, was the first wiki software written in PHP. The initial version was a feature-for-feature reimplementation of the WikiWikiWeb software. Subsequent versions adopted many features from UseModWiki.

Swiki was written in Squeak by Mark Guzdial and Jochen Rick in 1999.

Zwiki, written in Python in 1999, was based on the Zope web application server (it could also co-exist with the Plone content management system). It was initially developed by Simon Michael and Joyful Systems.

Traction TeamPage was released in December 1999; it was the first proprietary wiki application aimed at enterprise customers.

UseModWiki was developed from 1999 to 2000 by Clifford Adams. UseModWiki is a flat-file wiki written in Perl. It was based on Markus Denker's AtisWiki, which was in turn based on CvWiki. It introduced the square bracket syntax for linking words that was later adopted by many other wiki engines, such as MediaWiki.

MoinMoin, created in Python by Jürgen Hermann and Thomas Waldmann in mid-2000, was initially based on PikiPiki. It is a flat-file wiki with a simple code base but many possible extensions. MoinMoin uses the idea of separating the parsers (for parsing the wiki syntax) from the formatters (for outputting HTML code), with an interface between them, so that new parsers and output formatters can be written.

== Wikipedia's early years: 2001–2003 ==
=== The creation of Wikipedia ===
Until 2001, wikis were virtually unknown outside the restricted circles of computer programmers. Wikis were introduced to the general public by the success of Wikipedia, a free content encyclopedia that can be edited by anyone.

Wikipedia was originally conceived as a complement to Nupedia, a free on-line encyclopedia founded by Jimmy Wales, with articles written by highly qualified contributors and evaluated by an elaborate peer review process. The writing of content for Nupedia proved to be extremely slow, with only 12 articles completed during the first year, despite a mailing-list of interested editors and the presence of a full-time editor-in-chief recruited by Wales, Larry Sanger. Learning of the wiki concept, Wales and Sanger decided to try creating a collaborative website to provide an additional source of rapidly produced draft articles that could be polished for use on Nupedia.

Nupedia's editors and reviewers resisted the idea of associating Nupedia with a wiki-style website, so Wikipedia was launched on its own domain, wikipedia.com, on January 15, 2001. It initially ran on UseModWiki software, with the original text stored in flat-files rather than in a database, and with articles named using the CamelCase convention. UseModWiki was replaced by a PHP wiki engine in January 2002 and by MediaWiki in July 2002.

Wikipedia attracted new participants after being mentioned on Slashdot as well as in an article on the community-edited website Kuro5hin. It quickly overtook Nupedia. In the first year of its existence, over 20,000 encyclopedia entries were created.

=== Wikimedia Foundation and first Wikipedia sister projects ===
Wales, and other members of the Wikipedia user community, founded Wikipedia's first "sister site", "In Memoriam: September 11 Wiki", in October 2002; it detailed the September 11 attacks. (This project was closed in October 2006.) A second sister site, Wiktionary, was created in December 2002; the site was meant to be a collaboratively created dictionary.

In June 2003, Wales founded the Wikimedia Foundation, a non-profit organization, to manage Wikipedia and all its sister projects going forward. Two additional Wikimedia projects were added soon thereafter: Wikiquote, a reference for notable quotations, and Wikibooks, for collaboratively creating textbooks, both in July 2003. Another project, Wikisource, was added in November 2003; it was originally named "Project Sourceberg" (a play on Project Gutenberg), then renamed "Wikisource" in December 2003.

=== Other wiki websites, 2001–2003 ===
MeatballWiki rapidly became a popular wiki for discussions of wiki-related topics. The users of MeatballWiki came up with several ideas on the linking together of wikis, including:

- InterWikiMap, a simple interwiki linking system (2000)
- MetaWiki, the idea of a wiki that helps people find other wikis (not to be confused with the Wikimedia Meta-Wiki)
- OneBigWiki (2002), the idea of having one wiki distributed across several servers
- SwitchWiki (2003): the idea of having one site where one can switch between wikis
- WikiNode, a way to link wikis via a standard "node" page on each
- WackoWiki (2003), Fork from WikkaWiki one of the more than 100 Wiki Engines, that helped foster Wiki principles usage and development

Some of these ideas were later implemented. For example, WikiIndex, a wiki that lists other wikis, was created in 2006, in an attempt to implement the MetaWiki and SwitchWiki ideas. The site also includes a WikiNode of its own and catalogs sites which include their own WikiNodes.

Disinfopedia was launched by Sheldon Rampton in March 2003. It aimed to produce a directory of public relations firms and industry-funded organizations that attempt to influence public opinion and public policy. It was later renamed SourceWatch, and is currently run by the Center for Media and Democracy (CMD).

Javapedia was a wiki inspired by Wikipedia. The project was launched in June 2003 during the JavaOne developer conference, and was intended to cover all aspects of the Java platform.

Wikitravel was started in July 2003 by Evan Prodromou and Michele Ann Jenkins.

Memory Alpha is a wiki devoted to the Star Trek fictional universe. It was launched by Harry Doddema and Dan Carlson in December 2003. For its first several years, it was one of the largest wiki projects.

This period also saw the creation of several other general wiki encyclopedias, created either independently of Wikipedia or meant to serve as an alternative to Wikipedia in order to fix some perceived weakness in it:

- Susning.nu was a Swedish-language wiki, created in October 2001, meant to serve as an encyclopedia, dictionary, and discussion forum.
- Enciclopedia Libre was created in February 2002 as a fork of the Spanish-language Wikipedia, by a group of contributors to the Spanish Wikipedia, who left because of fears of censorship and the possibility of the placement of advertising on Wikipedia.
- Wikinfo was launched in July 2003 as "Internet-Encyclopedia". It was a fork of the English-language Wikipedia, meant to hold original research and multiple articles on subjects from different points of view, instead of Wikipedia's policy of a single neutral-point-of-view article. In 2013, after a period of downtime, the content was removed and a new version of Wikinfo was started at Wikia; however, as of June 2017, Wikinfo had been restored on wikinfo.org. Sometime later, the wikinfo.org domain lapsed from existence once again (as of January 2021).
- WikiZnanie is a Russian-language wiki encyclopedia created in 2003; it took most of its content from the Russian Brockhaus and Efron Encyclopedic Dictionary of 1906.

=== Development of wiki software, 2001–2003 ===
JSPWiki, created by Janne Jalkanen in 2001, is flat-file wiki software built around JavaServer Pages (JSP). JSPWiki adapted and extended the PhpWiki markup. It is primarily used for company and university intranets as a project wiki or a knowledge management application. It has also been used as a personal information manager (PIM).

MediaWiki was written for Wikipedia in 2002 by Lee Daniel Crocker, based on the user interface design of an earlier PHP wiki engine developed by Magnus Manske. Manske's PHP-based software suffered load problems due to increased use, so Crocker re-wrote the software with a more scalable MySQL database backend. As Wikipedia grew, achieving scalability through multiple layers of caching and database replication became a major concern for the developers. Internationalization was also a major concern (the user interface has been translated into more than 70 languages). One of the earliest differences between MediaWiki and other wiki engines was the use of freely formatted links instead of links in CamelCase. MediaWiki provides specialized syntax to support rich content, such as rendering mathematical formulas using LaTeX, graphical plotting, image galleries and thumbnails, and Exif metadata. MediaWiki lacks native WYSIWYG support, but comes with a graphical toolbar to simplify editing. One MediaWiki innovation for structuring content is "namespaces". Namespaces allow each article to contain multiple sheets with different standard names: one sheet presents the encyclopedic content, another contains the discussions surrounding it, and so on.

PmWiki was created in PHP by Patrick Michaud in 2002. It is a flat-file wiki engine that was designed to be easy to install and customize. PmWiki offers a template scheme that makes it possible to change the look and feel of the wiki. Customization is made easy through a wide selection of custom extensions, known as "recipes" available from the PmWiki Cookbook.

TikiWiki was created in PHP by Luis Argerich in 2002. It was later renamed "Tiki Wiki CMS Groupware", or simply "Tiki", as it gained additional CMS and groupware features. TikiWiki is modular with components that can be individually enabled and customized by the administrator, and extends customization to the user with selectable skins and themes.

Socialtext launched in 2002; it was the second proprietary enterprise-focused wiki application, after Traction TeamPage.

As they developed, wikis incorporated many of the features used on other websites and blogs, including:

- support for various wiki markup styles
- editing of pages with a GUI editor, WYSIWYG, and specific applications such as LaTeX
- optional use of external editors
- support for plugins and custom extensions
- use of RSS feeds
- integrated email discussion
- precise access control
- spam protection

== Explosion in interest: 2004–2006 ==
The period from 2004 to 2006 saw an explosion in interest in both wikis generally and Wikipedia in particular, and both started to become household terms. Corporations, organizations and other communities began to make increasing use of wikis. Many of the wiki-based sites, technologies and events that dominate today were started during that period.

XWiki is an open-source Java wiki application that was created by Ludovic Dubost in December 2003. Dubost set up hosting of XWiki-based wikis on the domain xwiki.com in January 2004—xwiki.com thus became an early (and possibly the first) wiki hosting service, or "wiki farm".

In October 2004, the wiki hosting service Wikicities launched, co-founded by Wikipedia founder Jimmy Wales and Wikimedia Foundation board member Angela Beesley. In March 2006, it changed its name to Wikia. Wikia remains one of the largest and most popular wiki farms.

A large number of other notable wiki farms were released soon afterward, including Wikispaces (launched March 2005), PBwiki (launched June 2005, later renamed PBworks), and Wetpaint (launched October 2005). Wikidot was launched in August 2006.

2005 marked the beginning of large-scale wiki-related meetings and conferences. August 2005 saw the first-ever Wikimania, an annual conference organized around Wikimedia Foundation projects, in Frankfurt, Germany. WikiSym, a more academic annual symposium about wikis in general, was first held a few months later, in October 2005, in San Diego, California; in 2014 it was renamed to OpenSym. RecentChangesCamp, an unconference dedicated to wikis, was first held in February 2006 in Portland, Oregon. Wikimania and OpenSym remain the two largest wiki-related gatherings.

Around 2005 wikis began to be massively confronted with "wiki spam", produced by spammers who enter website addresses onto wikis in order to improve the ranking of the displayed websites by search engines. Various strategies have been developed to counter wiki spam.

=== Wikipedia and other Wikimedia projects ===
Wikipedia experienced exponential growth in usage and readership during the period from 2004 to 2006, rising in Alexa rankings from the top 1000 websites into the top 15. It was named one of the top 5 global brands of 2006 in the Brandchannel Readers' Choice Awards.

In 2004, the Wikimedia Foundation launched three new sites: Wikispecies, for cataloging species, in August 2004, Wikimedia Commons, to hold images and other media used by the Wikimedia projects, in September 2004, and Wikinews, for publishing collaborative news articles, in December 2004. Wikiversity, intended for tutorials and other courseware, was later launched in August 2006.

In November 2005, journalist John Seigenthaler wrote a much-publicized article in USA Today about Wikipedia's article about him, which for over four months had contained a false statement about him, inserted as a joke, stating that he had been a suspect in the assassinations of John F. Kennedy and Robert F. Kennedy. The USA Today article generated a subsequent controversy that both caused Wikipedia to tighten its standards for creating articles, especially articles about living people, and highlighted the growing importance of Wikipedia as a source of information.

During this period, Wikipedia also began to enter the popular culture. A prominent example was the Weird Al Yankovic parody song "White & Nerdy", which peaked at #9 on the Billboard Hot 100 in late 2006, and contained the lyric "I edit Wikipedia." In December 2006, Time magazine chose "You" as their Person of the Year, referring to the rise of Web 2.0 and web technologies that allow for user-contributed content, and cited Wikipedia as one of the key websites that allow for "community and collaboration on a scale never seen before".

=== Other wiki websites, 2004–2006 ===
In July 2004, OpenStreetMap, a website to create an open-source street map of the world using wiki functionality, was launched.

Most of the major parody-based wikis launched at around this time. Encyclopedia Dramatica, which mocked internet culture, was founded in December 2004 (it was shut down in April 2011). Stupidedia, a German-language wiki intended as a direct spoof of Wikipedia, was also founded in December 2004, a week later. Uncyclopedia, an English-language wiki also intended to parody Wikipedia, was founded the next month, in January 2005; it was later extended to dozens of other languages, and merged in other wikis, including Stupidedia. La Frikipedia, a Spanish-language parody of Wikipedia, was founded in October 2005.

In January 2005, the wiki wikiHow was created as a component of the how-to website eHow. In April 2006, its creators sold off eHow and focused full-time on wikiHow, which was launched at its own domain. Both sites receive tens of millions of hits a month.

In April 2006, the company Internet Brands bought the sites WikiTravel and World66. The purchase of WikiTravel by a commercial entity led to the creation of the non-commercial travel wiki Wikivoyage by some former WikiTravel authors and administrators in December 2006. Wikivoyage originally held content in German and Italian, and started as a fork of WikiTravel content; in 2013 it would become a WMF site.

Two major Chinese wiki encyclopedias began in 2006: Baidu Baike in April and Hudong in November. (Hudong's English-language name was changed to Baike.com in 2012.) Both currently hold millions of articles, and exceed the popularity of the Chinese Wikipedia within China. Both are for-profit wikis, that, unlike Wikipedia, hold the copyright to their own content.

=== Development of wiki software, 2004–2006 ===
This period saw the launch of many wiki applications geared toward corporate/enterprise users. Such software was usually proprietary, and it usually included additional functionality, such as blogs and project management tools. Notable wiki software launched during this time includes:

- Trac (February 2004), created by Edgewall Software. Trac is an open source bug tracking and project management application, with wiki functionality.
- Confluence (March 2004), created by Atlassian.
- DokuWiki (July 2004), an open-source application intended for small companies' documentation needs.
- FlexWiki (September 2004), an open source application created by Microsoft. Written primarily by David Ornstein, FlexWiki used .NET technology and had an integrated scripting language called WikiTalk (based on Smalltalk). It stored content in either text files or a SQL Server database.
- JotSpot (October 2004), created by JotSpot, Inc. JotSpot was bought by Google in 2006 for an undisclosed amount; Google would later release the technology, in modified form, as Google Sites in 2008.
- SamePage (April 2006), created by eTouch Systems.
- Redmine (June 2006), an open source application similar to Trac.
- DekiWiki (July 2006), an open source application created by MindTouch, Inc. It had started as a fork of MediaWiki, but was then significantly rewritten before its release. DekiWiki was later renamed to "Deki", then "MindTouch Core".
- Clearspace (December 2006), created by Jive Software. Clearspace was later renamed "Jive SBS", then "Jive Engage" and then Jive.

wikiCalc, a wiki-based spreadsheet application, was launched in November 2005 by spreadsheet pioneer Dan Bricklin.

In November 2006 Microsoft released Microsoft Office SharePoint Server 2007, which included wiki and blog functionality for the first time.

In this period a number of semantic wiki applications were launched, including the currently most popular one, Semantic MediaWiki (which was first announced at Wikimania 2005).

== Wikis enter the mainstream: 2007–2013 ==
A milestone in public acceptance of wikis was reached in March 2007 when the word "wiki" entered the Oxford English Dictionary.

In January 2007, Amazon.com released Amapedia, a product-review wiki on its own website; it was shut down in June 2010.

In 2007, ShoutWiki, a wiki farm, was founded as an alternative to Wikia. In the same year, Encyc was founded using PmWiki, and in 2008 it transitioned to MediaWiki. Another MediaWiki-based wiki farm, MyWikis, was launched in 2012.

In February 2007, Penguin Books launched a wiki to create the planned novel A Million Penguins, in a well-publicized experiment at creating a crowd-generated novel. The wiki was shut down a month later, not having created a coherent work.

In March 2007, Larry Sanger, co-founder of Wikipedia, launched Citizendium, an "expert-guided" encyclopedia wiki requiring participants to use their real names.

In 2010, the site WikiLeaks (which had been founded in 2006) gained a great deal of both fame and notoriety as a result of a set of leaked documents the site published of classified materials from the United States government, notably footage of the July 12, 2007, Baghdad airstrike, the Afghan War documents leak and the United States diplomatic cables leak. The site was initially a true wiki editable by anyone, running on the MediaWiki application, though in 2010 had its permissions changed so that only its administrators could edit pages, and later it moved off of MediaWiki and was no longer a wiki.

=== Wikipedia and other Wikimedia projects, 2007–2013 ===
In 2007, Wikipedia entered the top 10 most popular websites in the world. Wikipedia began to be heavily referenced in television and other media during 2007; see Wikipedia in culture.

In August 2008, then-U.S. presidential candidate John McCain was accused of plagiarizing Wikipedia in a speech about Georgia. In June 2009, journalist Chris Anderson admitted to plagiarizing a series of Wikipedia articles in his book Free: The Future of a Radical Price. Anderson called it a "screwup", based on lack of clarity on how to cite a specific version of a Wikipedia article.

January 2011 saw the 10th anniversary of the creation of Wikipedia, with a large round of coverage in the international media, most of it positive, including a cover story in German newspaper Die Zeit with the headline "The greatest work of mankind".

In March 2012, a proposal was made to have the Wikimedia Foundation host a wiki containing travel advice, which led to a discussion and vote lasting several months. In August 2012 the company Internet Brands, owners of the Wikitravel site, sued two of its contributors who had spoken out in favor of the proposal. That lawsuit in turn led the Wikimedia Foundation to sue Internet Brands in September 2012 to not "impede, disrupt or block the creation of" such a site. The community proposal to host a travel guide wiki was successful, and the decision was made to incorporate Wikivoyage, a Wikitravel spinoff site, as a project.

The Wikidata project, which had been discussed in various guises for some time, was officially launched on October 30, 2012. Wikidata is a collaborative data repository meant to provide data that can be used by Wikipedia across all its languages.

January 14, 2013, saw the first official use of Wikidata: to enable the automatic display of "interlanguage links" within articles on the Hungarian Wikipedia.

January 15, 2013, the 12th anniversary of Wikipedia's founding, saw the launch of the new, Wikimedia-hosted Wikivoyage. The lawsuits regarding Wikivoyage between Wikimedia and Internet Brands were settled out of court the next month.

==== Reuse of Wikipedia data ====
Several applications were developed during this time to make use of Wikipedia's data in order to improve both structured querying and natural-language searching. These included:

- DBpedia, launched in January 2007; a project to publish structured data from Wikipedia in machine-readable, queriable form. By 2008, it became a major component of the Linked Data initiative.
- Freebase, launched by the company Metaweb in May 2007. Freebase stores information from Wikipedia and other sources in a structured, queriable format. Metaweb and Freebase were bought by Google in July 2010. The software later provided part of the technology behind the Google Knowledge Graph, launched in May 2012.
- Powerset, a company founded in 2005, in May 2008 released a search engine that used data from the English Wikipedia to answer natural-language queries. It was bought by Microsoft in July 2008, with the goal of improving results for the Bing search engine.

The Wikimedia Foundation project Wikidata is meant to provide a collaborative set of data that can make such querying easier, and available across all languages.

=== Wiki software, 2007–2013 ===
This period saw consolidation in the set of wiki software being used. A large number of wiki engines ended development during this time, including FlexWiki, MojoMojo, UseModWiki and Zwiki.

In October 2008, most developers of TWiki left the project to work on a fork of the code, Foswiki, after creator Peter Thoeny took control of the TWiki code and trademark via his company, TWiki.net.

In May 2009, Google announced its Google Wave platform (and its associated Federation protocol), which would combine the functionality of wikis with e-mail, instant messaging and social networking in order to provide a collaborative, real-time, server-hosted communication platform. Google Wave was released to the general public in May 2010, but development on it was ended several months later, in August 2010. In December 2010, Google transferred control of the software's development to the Apache Foundation, and it was renamed "Apache Wave".

In December 2010, wiki functionality was added to the SAP NetWeaver Portal application.

In 2011, a wiki application, named Phriction, was added to the open-source collaboration suite Phabricator.

In April 2013, MindTouch Inc. abandoned its open-source product and moved to MindTouch being only a proprietary, hosted service.

In July 2013, Wetpaint sold off its wiki service to WikiFoundry, having changed its business model to the hosting of professionally generated content.

== Further consolidation and innovation: 2014–present ==
The period starting in 2014 saw a further decrease in wiki software offerings, as applications and hosted solutions including Apache Wave, MindTouch, SamePage, TWiki and Wikispaces stopped development. Conversely, a number of new proprietary hosted knowledge-management solutions, which include a wiki component, were launched, including Notion in 2016. The MediaWiki-based hosting site Miraheze launched in 2015.

The site Everipedia, a competitor to Wikipedia that stores its information on a blockchain, launched in 2015.

Wikia was gradually renamed to Fandom between 2016 and 2021.

Wikimedia Foundation launched Wikifunctions in 2023 and closed Wikinews in 2026.

== See also ==
- Comparison of wiki software
- History of Wikipedia
- List of wikis
- List of wiki software
- meta:List of largest wikis
