= Chance Coach =

Chance Coach or Chance Coach, Inc. may refer to:

- Chance Rides (for the period 1976 - 1988)
- Optima Bus Corporation (for the period 1988 onwards)
