= MeatballWiki =

Wiki dedicated to online communities

- Website type: Wiki
- Creator: Sunir Shah
- Website: meatballwiki.org
- Launched: 2000
- Current status: Active (Read-only archive from 2013 to March 2021)
- Content license: None (Content is copyrighted by MeatballWiki or respective authors.)

MeatballWiki is a wiki dedicated to online communities, network culture, and hypermedia. Containing a record of experience on running wikis, it is intended for "discussion about wiki philosophy, wiki culture, instructions and observations."

According to founder Sunir Shah, it ran on "a hacked-up version of UseModWiki". In April 2013, after several spam attacks and a period of downtime, the site was made read-only. In March 2021, the site was de-spammed and reopened for editing as part of a rebuilding effort alongside Ward's Wiki and Community Wiki.

== Founding ==
MeatballWiki was started in 2000 by Sunir Shah, a forum administrator from Ontario, Canada, on Clifford Adams's Internet domain usemod.com. MeatballWiki was created as a place for discussion about Ward Cunningham's WikiWikiWeb and its operation, which were beyond the scope of WikiWikiWeb. As Sunir Shah stated in the WikiWikiWeb page referring to MeatballWiki: "Community discussions about how to run the community itself should be left here. Abstract discussions, or objective analyses of community are encouraged on MeatballWiki." Shah created this site "as a friendly fork of WikiWikiWeb." About the Meatball project, the website says: "The web, and media like it, looks like a big bowl of meatball spaghetti. You've got content – the meatballs – linked together with the spaghetti."

== Relationship to wiki community ==
The original intent of MeatballWiki was to offer observations and opinions about wikis and their online communities, aiming to support online communities, culture and hypermedia.

In Good Faith Collaboration, Joseph M. Reagle Jr. describes MeatballWiki as "the wiki about wiki collaboration". Being a community about communities, MeatballWiki became the launching point for other wiki-based projects and a general resource for broader wiki concepts, reaching "cult status". It describes the general tendencies observed on wikis and other online communities, for example the life cycles of wikis and people's behavior on them.

What differentiates MeatballWiki from many online meta-communities is that participants spend much of their time talking about sociology rather than technology, and when they do talk about technology, they do so in a social context.

The MeatballWiki members created a "bus tour" through existing wikis.

Barnstars – badges that wiki editors use to express appreciation for another editor's work – were invented on MeatballWiki and adopted by Wikipedia in 2003.

Evgeny Morozov of Boston Review notes that another Wikipedia norm around voting may also have stemmed from MeatballWiki.

== See also ==
- History of wikis
- Online community
