= Hungarian Wikipedia =

Hungarian-language edition of Wikipedia

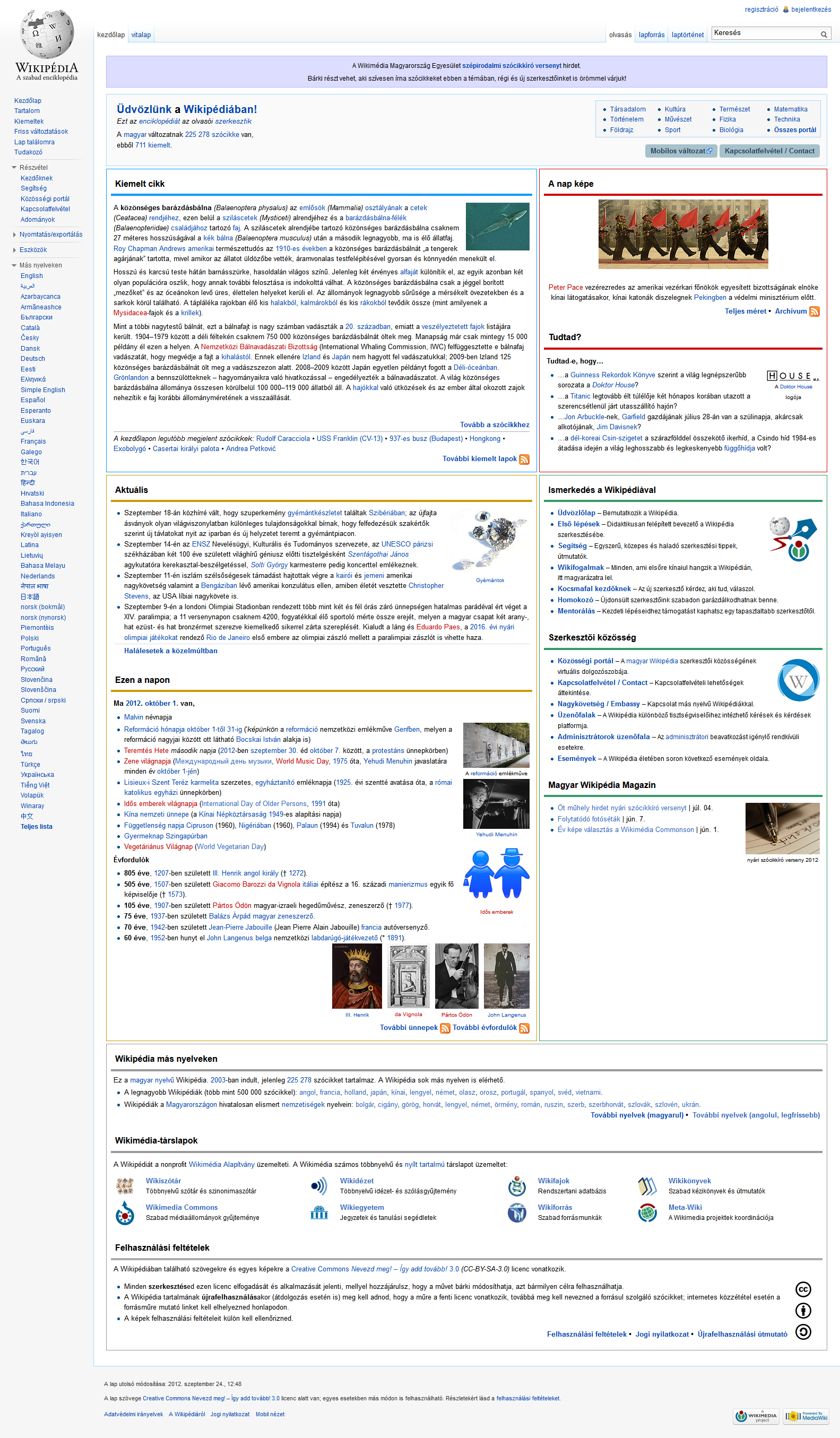
- Screenshot
- Website type: Internet encyclopedia project
- Available in: Hungarian
- Headquarters: Miami, Florida
- Owner: Wikimedia Foundation
- Founder: Péter Gervai
- Website: hu.wikipedia.org
- Commercial: No
- Registration: Optional
- Launched: 8 July 2003; 23 years ago
- Content license: Creative Commons Attribution/ Share-Alike 4.0 (most text also dual-licensed under GFDL); Media licensing varies

Number of articles and average daily edits in the first 15 years. The peak during 2015 was made by automated (bot) editions.

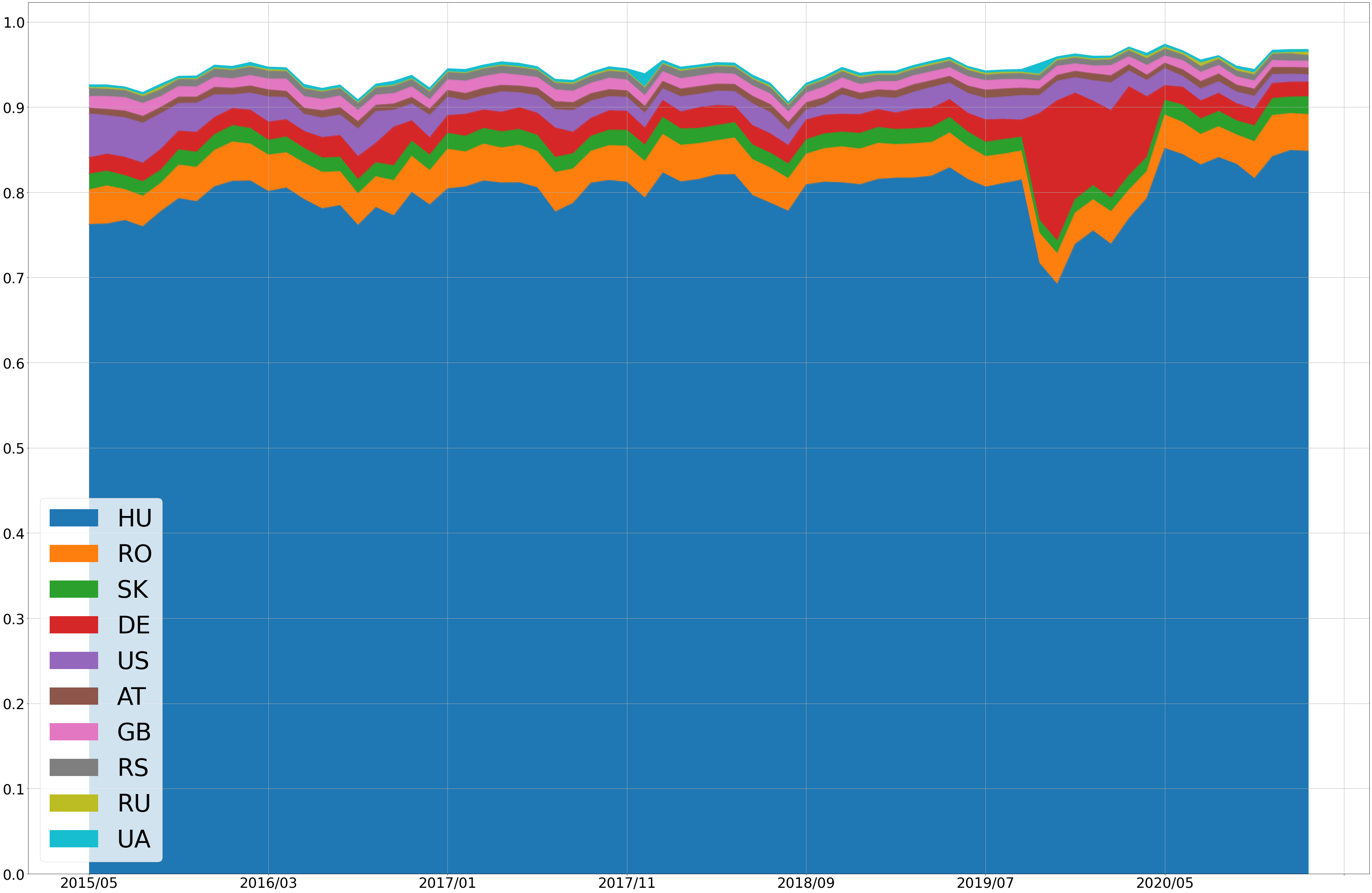
Origin of viewers: Hungary represents more than 80% of visits, followed by countries with an important Hungarian diaspora such as Romania and Slovakia.

The Hungarian Wikipedia (Hungarian: Magyar Wikipédia) is the Hungarian/Magyar version of Wikipedia, the free encyclopedia. Started on 8 July 2003 by Péter Gervai, this version reached the 300,000-article milestone in May 2015. The 500,000th article was born on 16 February 2022. As of 27 September 2026, this edition has 574,487 articles and is the 31st largest Wikipedia edition.

== History ==
The first Wikipedia related to the Hungarian language was created on 5 September 2001, by Larry Sanger, the English language Wikipedia coordinator at the time. He created the address at http://hu.wikipedia.com/. At that time Wikipedia was still running on the UseModWiki software. For many months there was little Hungarian content, and there were problems with vandalism.

The Hungarian Wikipedia as it is known today was launched by Péter Gervai on 8 July 2003. On this day, the opening page was made available with a Hungarian interface and in Hungarian, at its current address of http://hu.wikipedia.org/. Since its launch it has been growing steadily, moving up in the multilingual ranking from 34th place in 2003 to 18th place in December 2005 and 17th in December 2009, then dropping slightly to 19th place in September 2011.

On 31 October 2010, the Hungarian Wikipedia contained 179,894 articles with 8,992,153 edits by 38 administrators, 153,779 registered users as well as many unregistered ones.

On 14 January 2013, the Hungarian Wikipedia became the first to enable the provision of interlanguage links via Wikidata.

=== Milestones ===
The Hungarian Wikipedia reached the 50,000-article milestone on 7 February 2007, the 100,000th on 17 July 2008, and the 150,000th on 25 December 2009, by which it matched the size of the first complete Hungarian encyclopedia, the Pallas's Great Lexicon. The 200,000-article milestone was reached in September 2011, and it was marked by a new version of the Wikipedia globe showing 200,000 moving onward.

On 17 June 2010, the number of featured articles reached 500.

On 7 May 2015, Hungarian Wikipedia reached 300,000 articles.

The 400,000th article was born on 15 December 2016.

The Hungarian Wikipedia reached 500,000 articles on 16 February 2022.

== Most disputed articles ==
According to a 2013 Oxford University study, the most-disputed article on the Hungarian Wikipedia was "Gypsy crime".

== Gallery ==
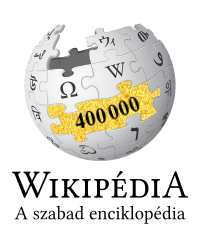
Hungarian Wikipedia 400,000 articles logo

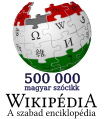
Hungarian Wikipedia 500,000 articles logo
