= UseModWiki =

Free and open-source wiki software

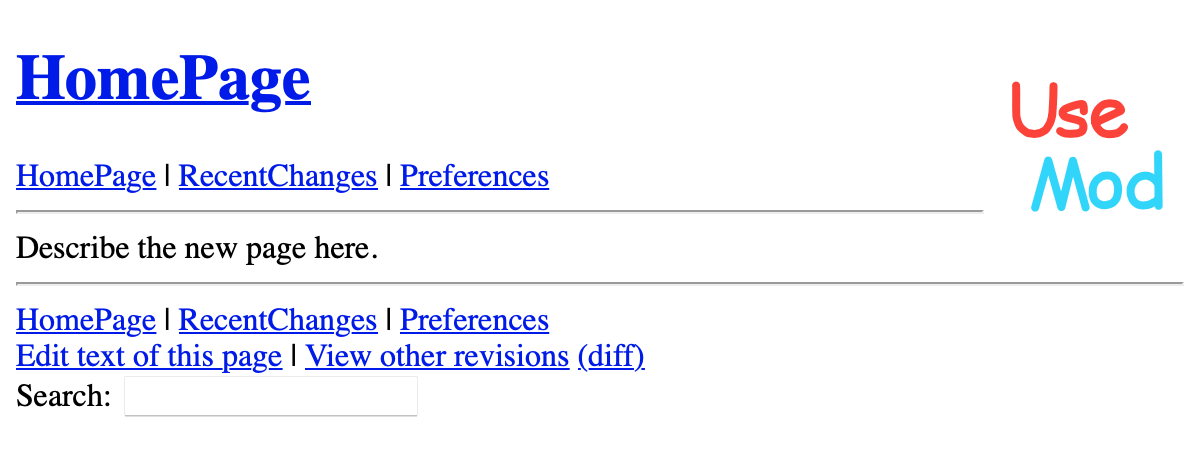
- Default homepage of UseModWiki 1.2.1
- Developers: Clifford Adams, Markus Lude
- Release: October 11, 1999
- Stable release: 1.2.3 / August 16, 2025
- Written in: Perl
- Size: 62.5 KiB (compressed)
- Type: Wiki software
- License: GPL
- Website: www.usemod.org/cgi-bin/wiki.pl
- Repository: codeberg.org/usemod/usemod

UseModWiki is a wiki software written in Perl and licensed under the GNU General Public License. Pages in UseModWiki are stored in ordinary files, not in a relational database. Wikipedia projects in English and many other languages were powered by UseModWiki before switching to MediaWiki.

== History ==
In the 1990s, Clifford Adams initiated the Usenet Moderation project that would allow users to share rating, editing, and eventually summary/change information about Usenet postings. It was replaced by the concept of wikis in 1999, and the development of UseModWiki started on October 11 as a simplified fork of the WikiWikiWeb clone AtisWiki. From version 0.4 ("WikiFour") in November 1999, more functions and improvements were introduced to UseModWiki. In 2000, the second UseModWiki website MeatballWiki was launched and hosted in usemod.com, along with the official website of UseModWiki.

In 2001, as Adams was both of the UseModWiki developer and a Wikipedian, he brought many improvements for the usages of an encyclopedia to v0.91 and v0.92, especially "free links" that uses double square-brackets (e.g., [[Wikipedia]]) as an option for linking to another page, supplementing the older functionality of using camel case. In September 2003, after two years of development from the previous version, the release of version 1.0 introduced many new features including CSS, RSS, file uploads, and UTF-8.

The development was then halted, and a cross-site scripting vulnerability (CVE-2004-1397) was discovered in December 2004. It was patched in July 2007 when Markus Lude took over the project of UseModWiki from Clifford Adams, with the release of version 1.0.1. Only bug fixing versions were released since that. The official domain was moved to usemod.org in late September 2023, and a minor update for that change was released later in November.

== Use by Wikipedia ==
English Wikipedia in 2001

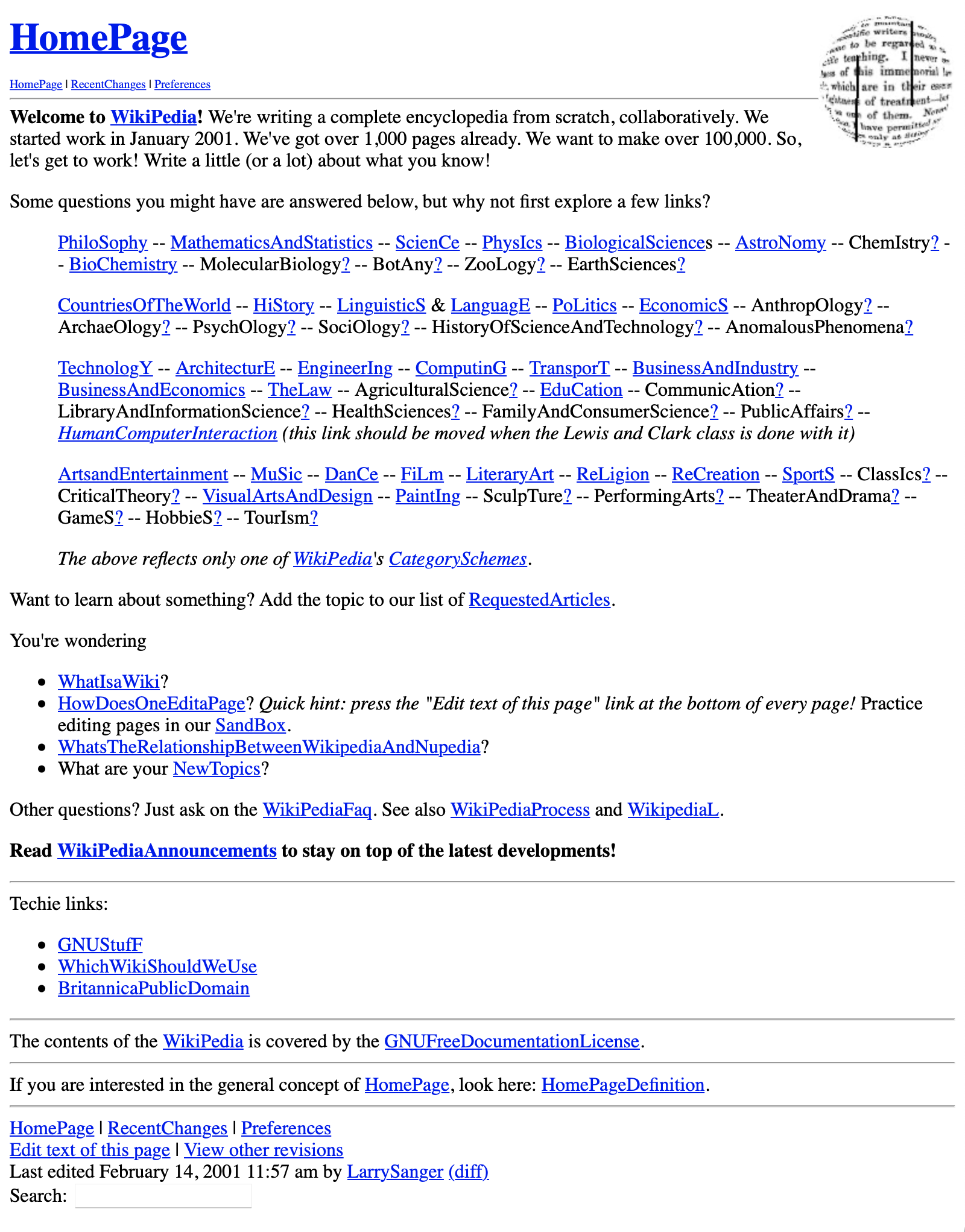
February

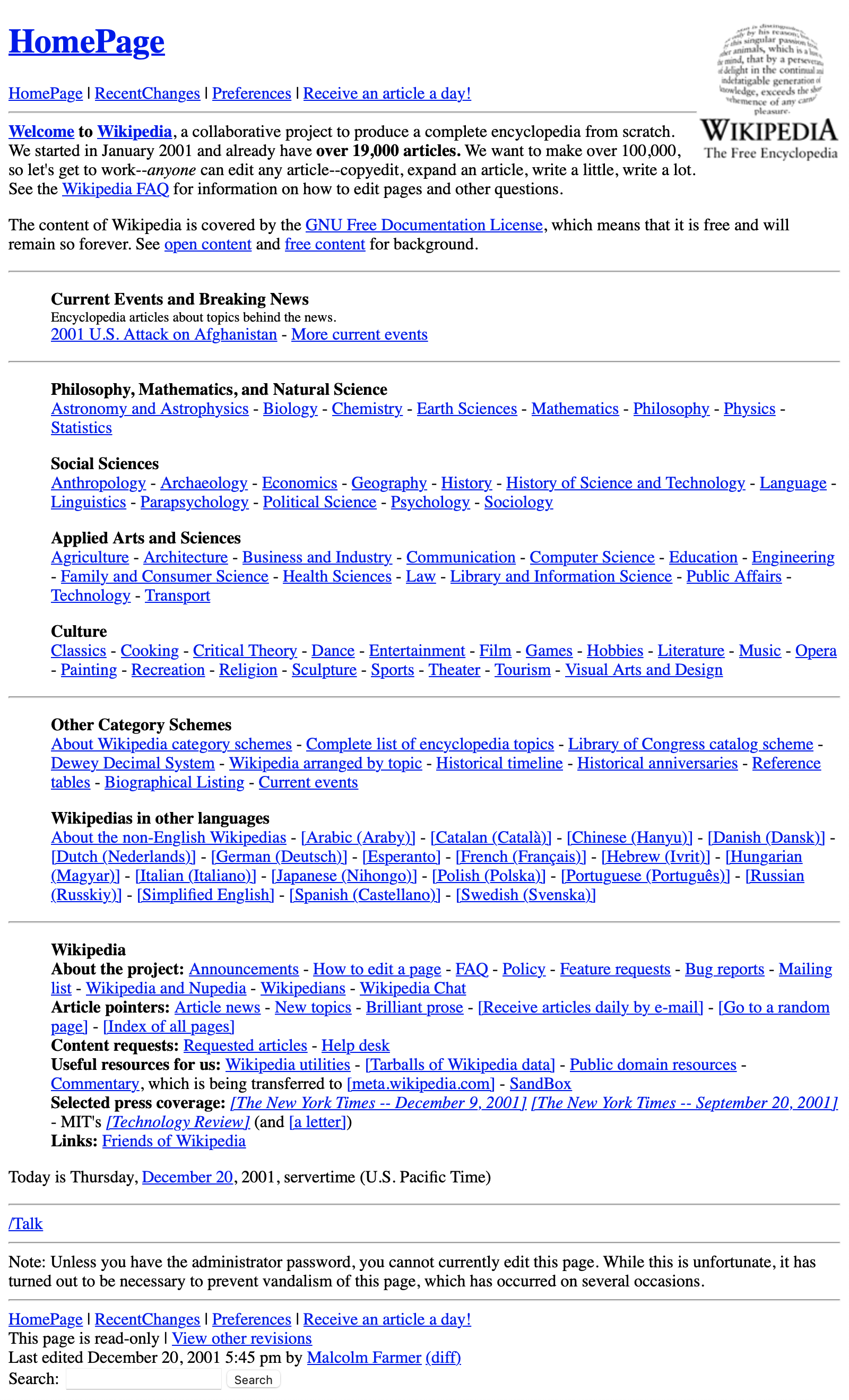
December

UseModWiki supports both of camel case and "free links" for linking to another page.

The wiki software for the English Wikipedia was UseModWiki (phase I, retroactively) since the establishment on January 15, 2001, and as of January 2002, Wikipedias in 22 languages were powered by UseModWiki. The English edition switched to "the PHP script" (phase II) on January 25, 2002, a new wiki software based on UseModWiki but rewritten in PHP. On July 20, "the PHP script" was then replaced by its own rewritten wiki software (phase III), currently known as MediaWiki, for better performance and functionality.

Other language editions gradually switched to MediaWiki afterwards, and as of late 2003, only a few active editions including Catalan Wikipedia were still powered by UseModWiki. In 2004, the last-remaining UseModWiki editions switched to MediaWiki.

== See also ==
- List of wiki engines
- mw:MediaWiki history
