= Péter Gervai =

Hungarian IT development engineer

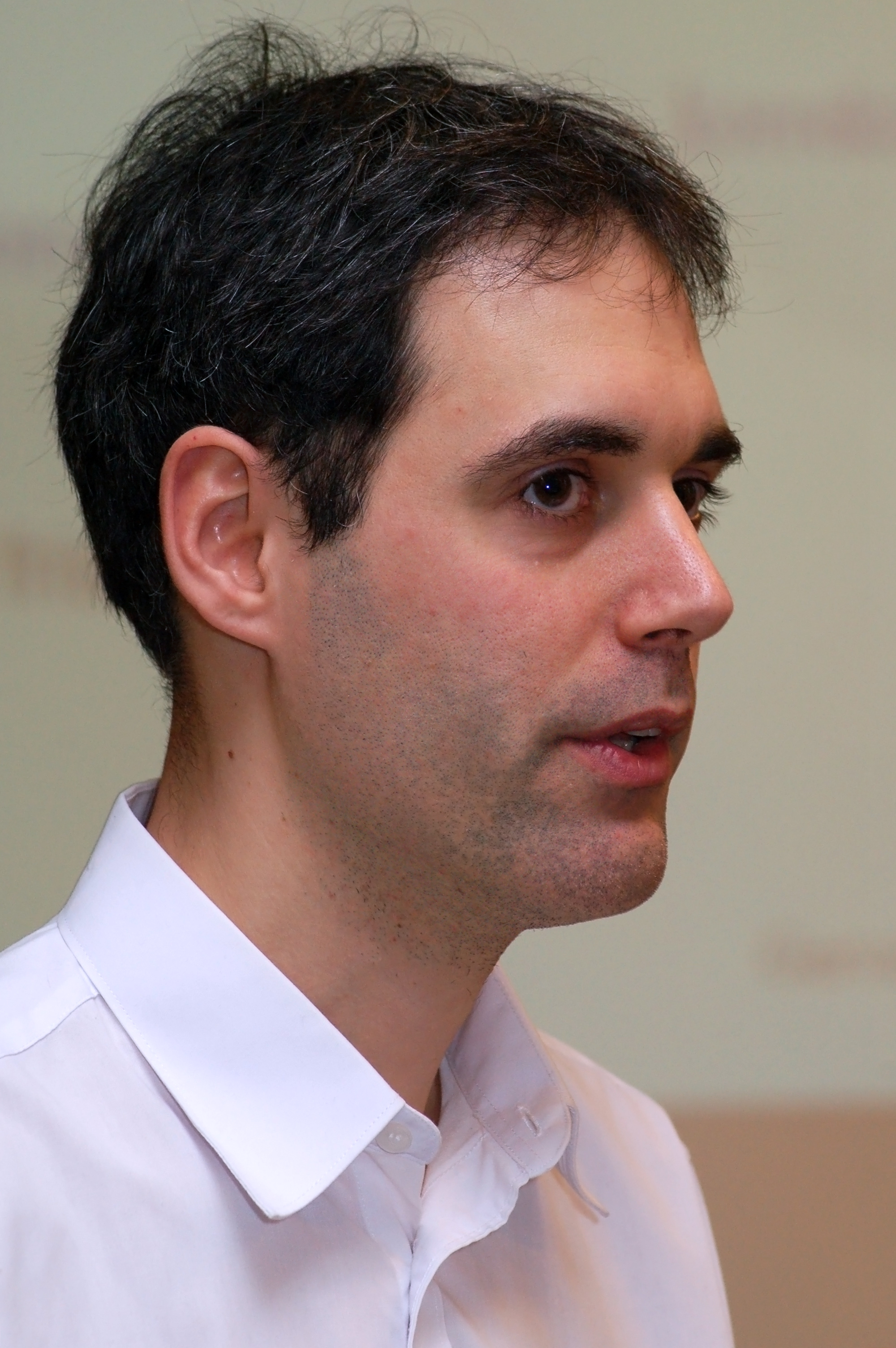
- Péter Gervai in January 2011
- Born: Péter Gervai; January 7, 1972 (age 54); Debrecen; Hungary
- Other name: Gervai Grin Péter or grin (online alias)
- Education: Kandó Kálmán Műszaki Főiskola
- Title: Founder of the Hungarian Wikipedia
- Board member of: Wikimedia Hungary
- Awards: Lifetime Achievement Award eFestival 2009
- Website: https://grin.hu/

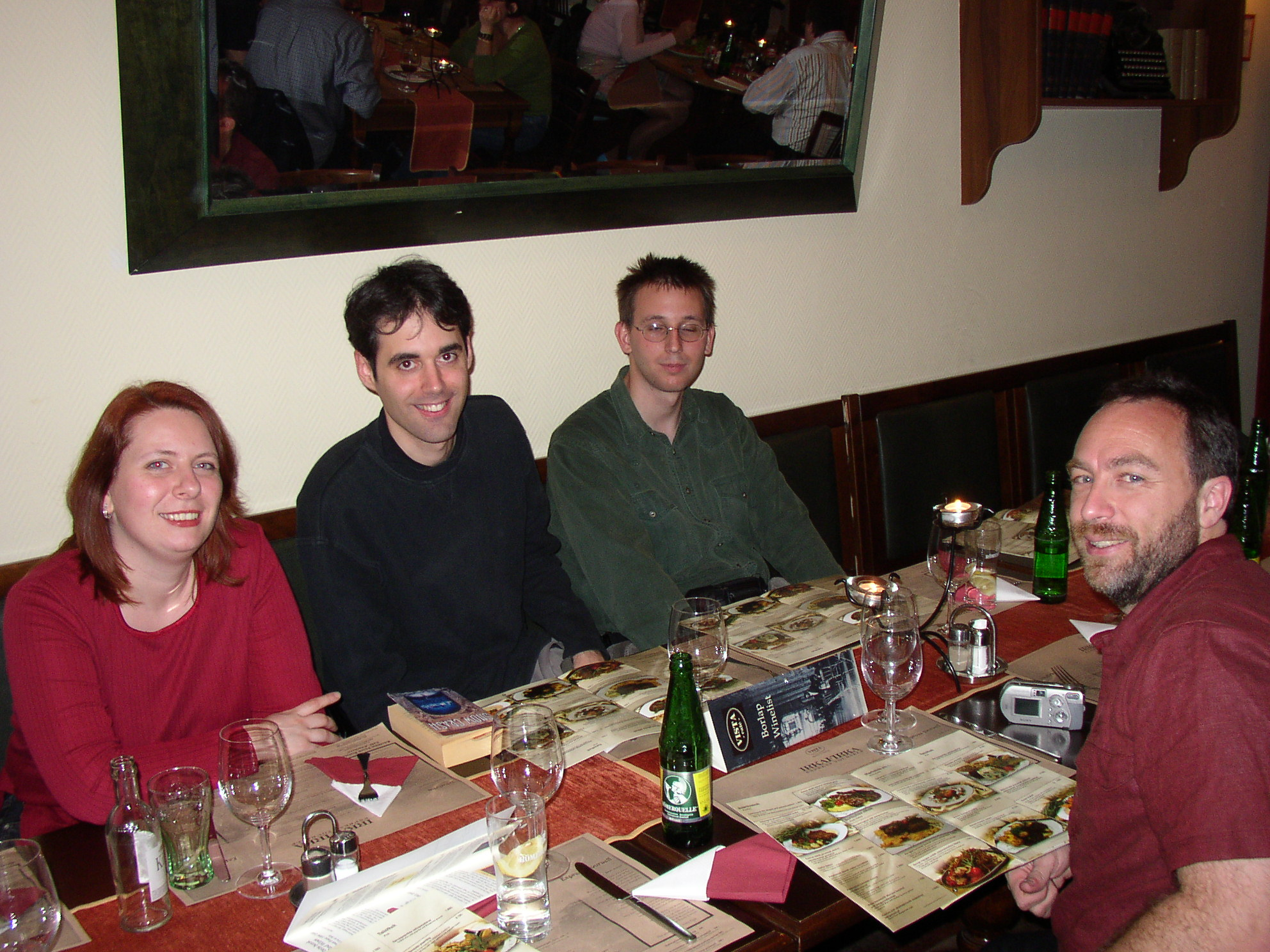
Wikipedia Hungary meeting with Jimmy Wales 2005.10.16.

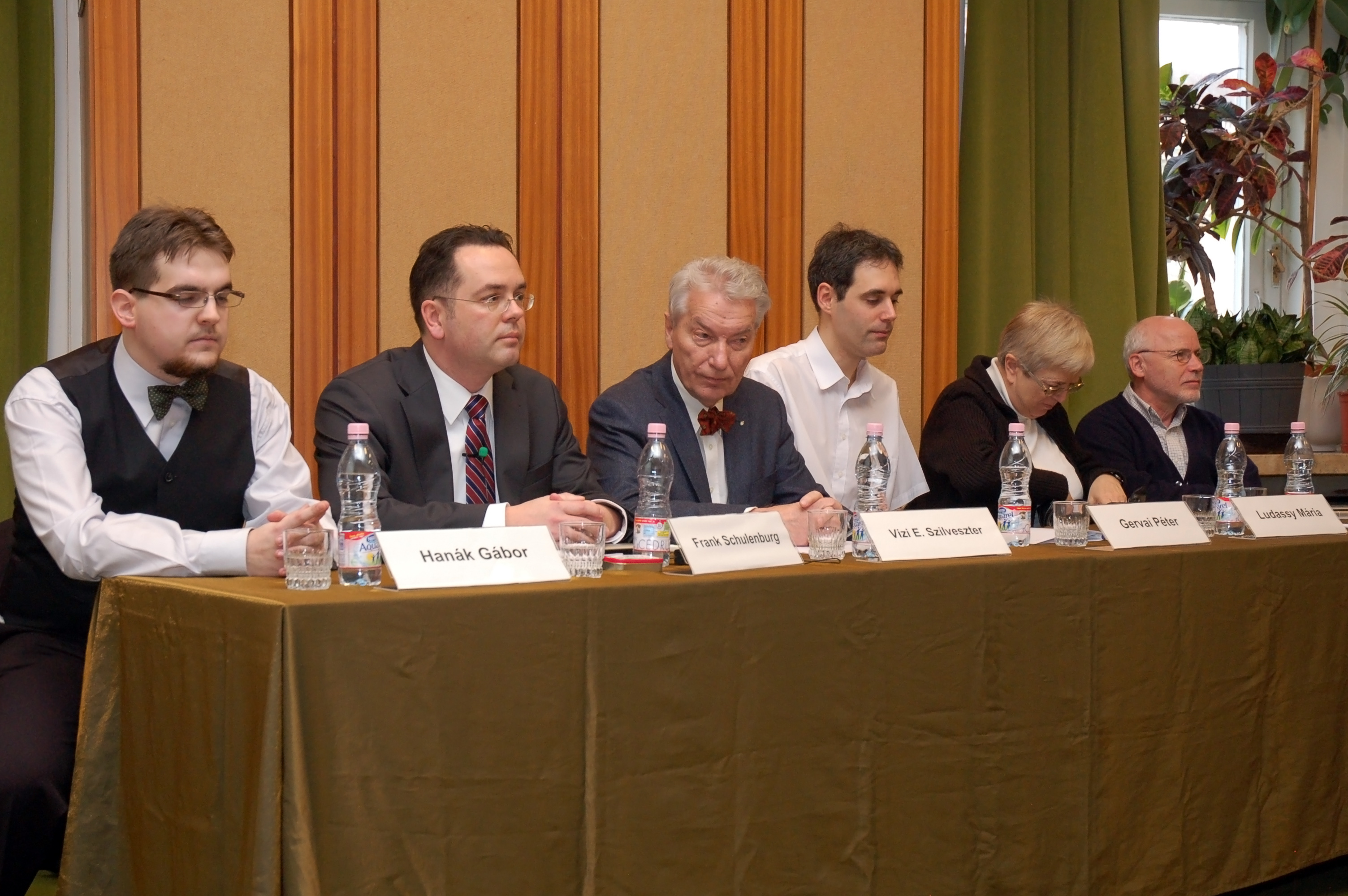
"The first presentations team." Gabor Hanak, Frank Schulenburg, Szilveszter E. Vizy, Peter Gervai, Maria Ludassy, Tamas Vicsek

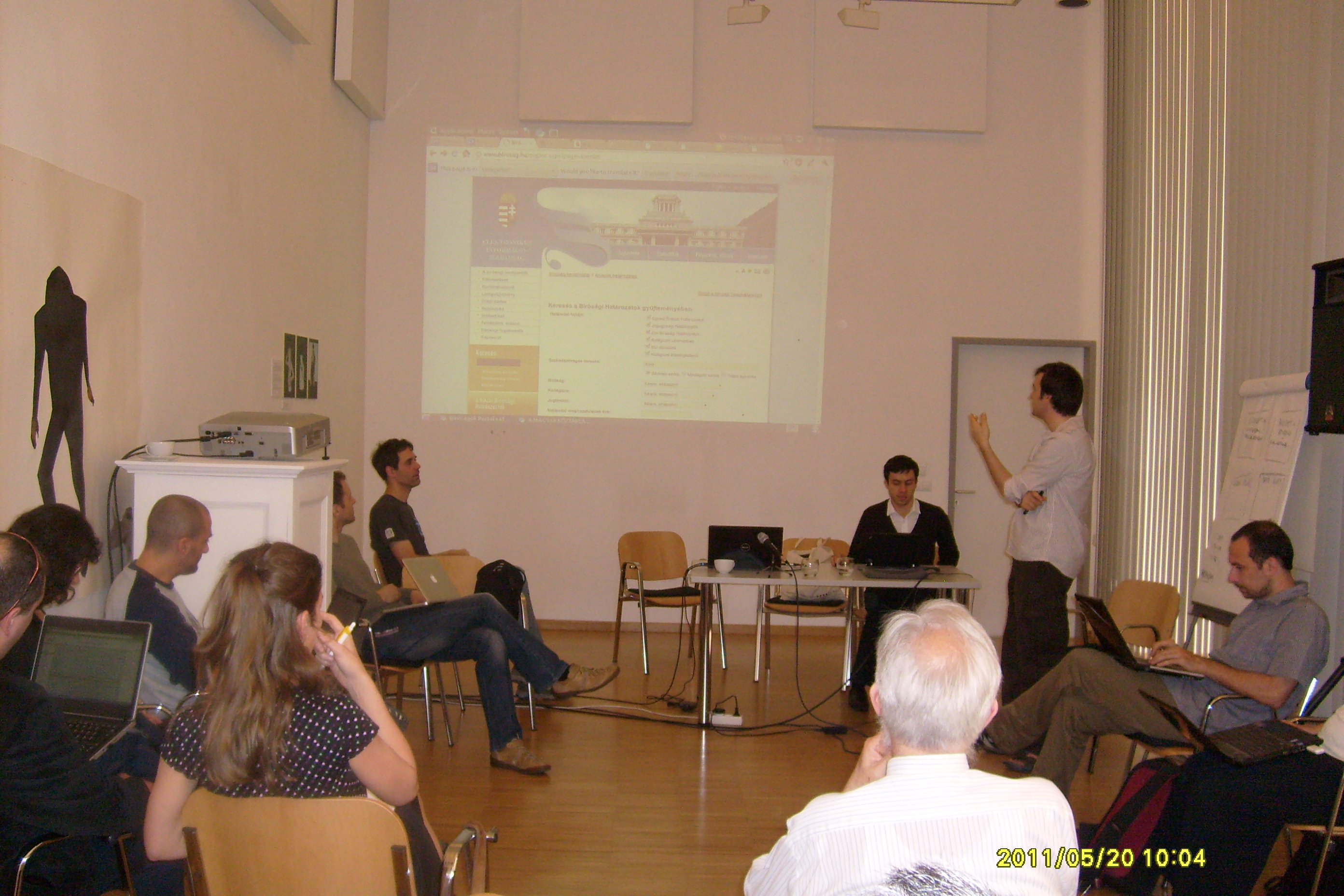
Open Government Data Workshop Budapest Péter Gervai, Rufus Pollock, Jonathan Gray 2011.05.20.

Péter Gervai (born 7 January 1972) is a Hungarian IT development engineer, the founder of the Hungarian Wikipedia and the chair of Wikimedia Hungary. He was one of the pioneers of Internet culture in Hungary, as operator of the LifeForce BBS and the author of a snarky webpage about chain emails which was widely used to educate senders of such mail.

== Personal life ==
Péter Gervai is married and has two children. Besides his native Hungarian, he speaks fluently in English and German.

== Career ==
He graduated from Fazekas Mihály Gimnázium in 1990. Then he studied at Kandó Kálmán Műszaki Főiskola in Budapest. He worked at FidoNet as a moderator, and he was the maintainer of the LifeForce BBS, which was among the pioneers in Hungary. The starter of the Mozilla Open Directory's Hungarian part, He participated in several open source projects. He was elected as president of the newly formed "Hungarian Wikimedia Association" on 27 September 2008. He has a diverse interest mainly focused on technical areas, computers, mostly internet access and service providing, security, network design and programming, but he also likes reading and writing literature.

=== Milestones ===
- 1984–1999, BBS sysop, FidoNet node (and OtherNets nodes), moderator
- 1993–1994, KKVMF, software engineer
- 1994–1997, Budapest Bank, software engineer
- 1994–1997, ExaBit Bt., Executive Director
- 1996– ObjectREXX course, (OS/2)
- 1997–2005, Cory-Net Kft., Technical Director
- 2004–2008, Council of Hungarian Internet Providers - a Member of the Presidency
- 2008– President of the Hungarian chapter of Wikimedia Foundation (Wikimédia Magyarország Egyesület)

== Conferences ==
- Hungarian Inventors' Day, Budapest, 2011, June 16. lecturer,
- Open Government Data Workshop, Budapest, 2011. May 20. (Friday, May 20, 2011 from 10:00 AM – 7:00 PM (GMT+0100))
- "Ten years of Wikipedia" conference, 2011, January 15, Buda Castle, National Széchényi Library

== Interviews ==
- Ígéretes magyar internetes lexikon, 2004. July 13.,
- Lelkesít a tudás átadása (A 168 óra interjúja Gervai Péterrel), 2005. December 15.,
- Eltűnik-e a könyv?, 2008. October 25., ITB-online,
- A komolyság világjátéka, Népszabadság, 2008. November 15.,
- Sokak szerint az is nevetséges, hogy van szócikk a sámánokról, 2010. December 20.,
- Az Omegával kezdődött a magyar Wikipédia, 2011. January 24., IT Cafe,
- Modernkori kódexmásoló, 2011. February 1., ITB-online,
- Encyclopedia on the Net: The Wikipedia Story, 2011. March 13., 168 Óra Online,
- "Nem gondoltam volna, hogy ez lesz belőle" - a magyar Wikipédia alapítójának portréja, 2018. March 4., Business magazin, Budapest,

== Publications ==
- The Wikipedia, from idea to fame, Wikipédia, az ötlettől a hírnévig. 2006. May 29.

== Awards ==
- eFestival 2009 - Lifetime Achievement Award of the Hungarian Association of Content Industry for the establishment of the Hungarian-language Wikipedia.
