= Optima Bus Corporation =

Defunct American bus manufacturer

Optima Bus, LLC
- Formerly: Chance Coach Inc. (1976–2003); Optima Bus Corporation (2003-2007)
- Industry: Bus manufacturing
- Founded: 1976 (as Chance Coach Inc.)
- Defunct: 2010
- Headquarters: Wichita, Kansas
- Products: Transit buses
- Parent: American Capital Strategies (1998-2006); NABI, Inc. (2006-2010)
- Website: www.optimabus.com (archived link)

Optima Bus, LLC, formerly Chance Coach Inc., was a brand of small transit buses manufactured by North American Bus Industries. It was established in 1976 in Wichita, Kansas.

It was originally the trolley-replica and conventional bus production business of Chance Industries, Inc. In 1998, Chance Coach, Inc. was sold to American Capital Strategies, which rebranded the company as Optima Bus Corporation in 2003. American Capital subsequently sold Optima to North American Bus Industries, who closed the Kansas assembly plant on August 8, 2007, with production moved to their existing plant in Anniston, Alabama. Optima Bus was owned by North American Bus Industries, Inc. until 2010 when NABI discontinued the production of its Optima and Blue Bird brand commercial bus products.

== Models ==
Logo used from 2003 to 2007

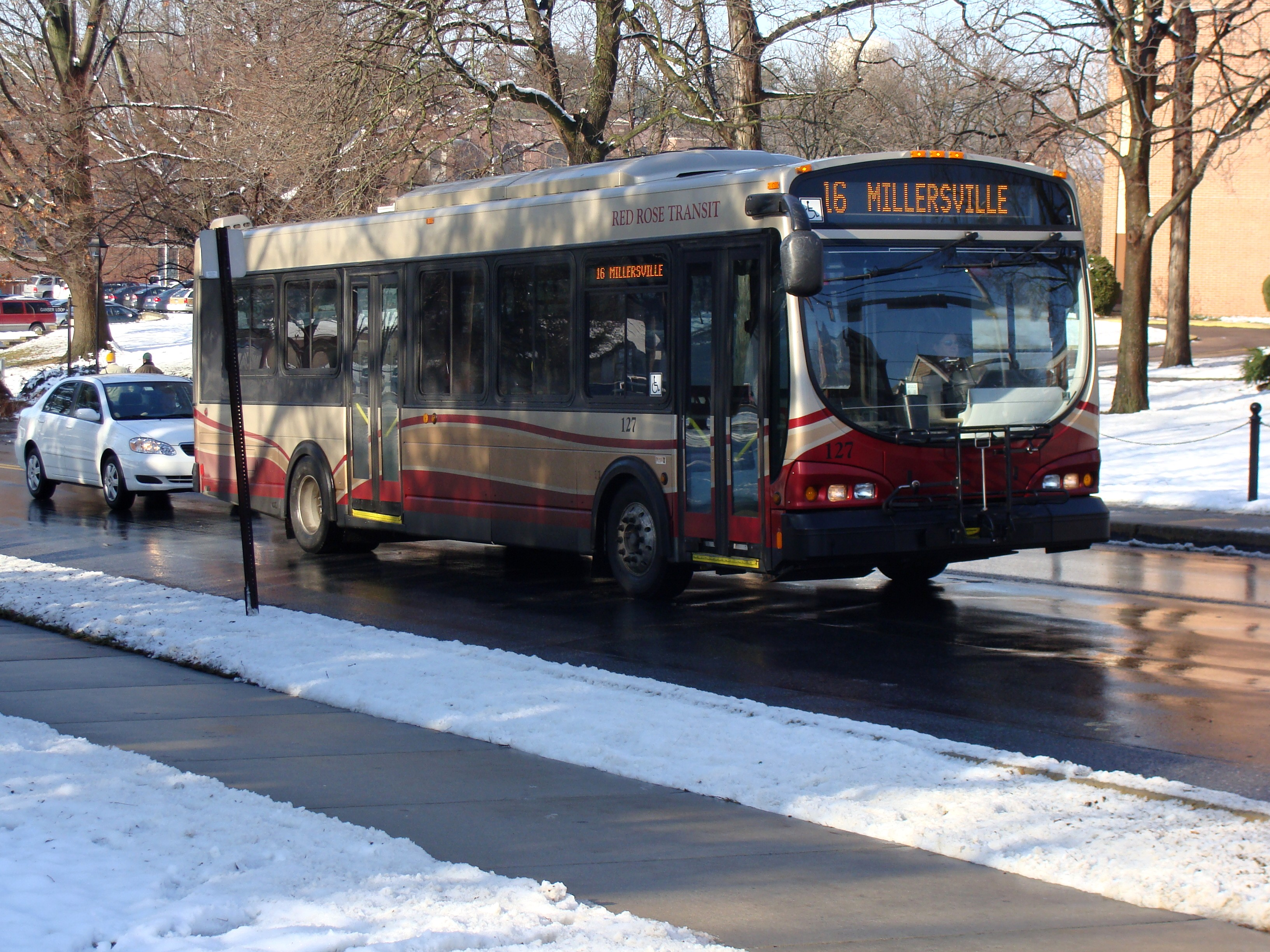
An Opus run by the Red Rose Transit Authority.

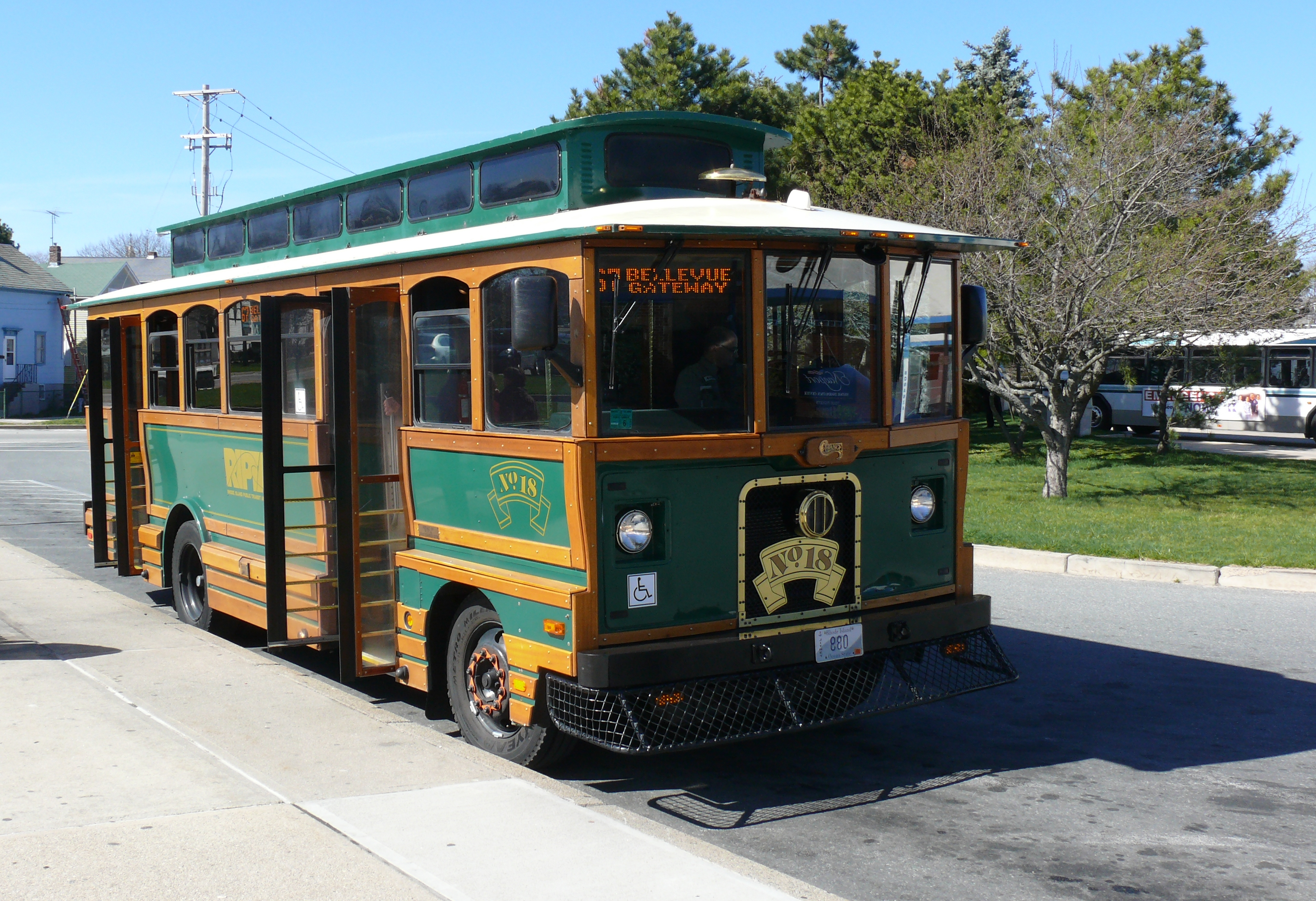
RIPTA CNG trolley replica #18

- Opus: under 30 ft (9.14 m) or under 35 ft (10.67 m) low-floor bus; designed in collaboration with Northern Irish manufacturer Wrightbus' international Expotech division
  - Opus ISE Series Hybrid: hybrid version of the Opus. It utilizes ISE-Siemens ThunderVolt hybrid technology built around Siemens ELFA motors, generators and inverters.
- American Heritage Streetcar AH-28 - trolley-style body on bus chassis

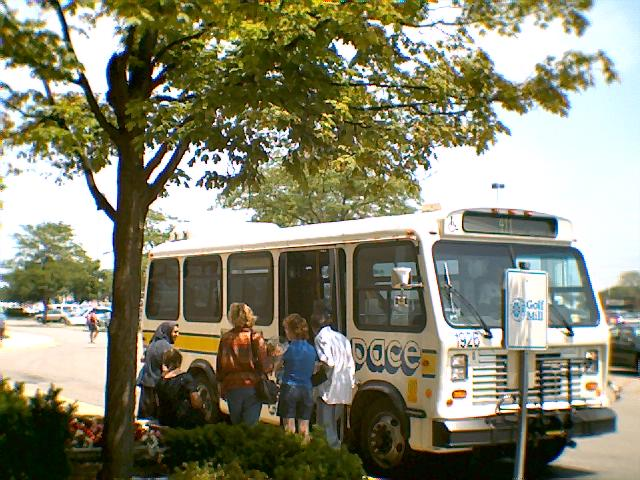
Pace RT-52 in Niles, Illinois.

- RT-52: a front-engined small-sized transit bus measuring 25 feet 11 inches (7.90 metres) in length. It was primarily used as a shuttle bus, and normally carried 19 passengers. The maximum passenger capacity was 23 passengers. Powered by an inline 6-cylinder Cummins 6BTA5.9 turbo diesel engine displacing 5.9 litres; 359.0 cubic inches (5,883 cubic centimetres), coupled to an Allison MT643 manual transmission, its gross vehicle weight (GVW) was 24,000 pounds (11,000 kilograms), its wheelbase was 170 inches (4,300 millimetres), and it was 96 inches (2,400 millimetres) wide.

The RT-52 was used in the Wiki Wiki Shuttle route at Honolulu International Airport. The first wiki site, called WikiWikiWeb, was named by its programmer, Ward Cunningham, after this line of buses. The buses were also purchased by Pace, primarily for use in Niles, Illinois; all have now been retired, with the last one running service routes in May 2007.

- Sunliner: an open-air towed tram used at various parks and zoos in the United States and Canada
