= Amapedia =

Wiki run by Amazon.com (2007-2010)

Amapedia was a wiki run by the retailer Amazon.com, that existed from January 2007 to June 2010, where users could edit articles about Amazon's products. Anyone with an account on Amazon.com could edit the contents of Amapedia.

== Beginnings ==
The amapedia.com domain name was registered in 2005. Jonah Cohen, a programmer who worked on the project in the summers of 2005 and 2006, described it as a "Wikipedia-inspired product website" in his resume, said it was developed with PHP and PostgreSQL.

The wiki was launched in mid-2006 as "ProductWiki", then renamed Amapedia in early 2007. Even after Amapedia's closing, an Amazon.com page still referred to the wiki as "ProductWiki". Amapedia was unrelated to the website productwiki.com.

== Editing ==
Individual product pages on Amazon.com contained the text, "Be the first person to add an article about this item at Amapedia.com" if no article about the product existed.

Editing was done using a WYSIWYG interface. There was a separate table editor.

Amazon retains the copyright to the content of the site and licensed the compilation for personal use only.

== History ==
In February 2007, a senior editor at Business 2.0 said "The Amapedia appears stillborn, as Amazon users stick with what they're used to: individual, rather than collaborative, product reviews."

Even by Spring 2010, the logo for the site, on every page, still included the word "beta", with the copyright message indicating "2005 - 2007", making the project appear to be on hold.

In June 2010, the site became inoperable, with the home page simply displaying the site logo and the words "Amapedia is not available at this time". By several months later, the site was no longer accessible at all.
