= Portland Pattern Repository =

American software design pattern repository

The Portland Pattern Repository (PPR) is an online repository for computer programming software design patterns. It was accompanied by the website WikiWikiWeb, the world's first wiki. The repository has an emphasis on extreme programming, and is hosted by Cunningham & Cunningham (C2) of Portland, Oregon. The PPR's motto is "People, Projects & Patterns".

== History ==
On 17 September 1987, programmer Ward Cunningham with Tektronix and Apple Computer's Kent Beck co-published the paper "Using Pattern Languages for Object-Oriented Programs" This paper, about software design patterns, was inspired by Christopher Alexander's architectural concept of "patterns" It was written for the 1987 OOPSLA programming conference organized by the Association for Computing Machinery. Cunningham and Beck's idea became popular among programmers because it helped them exchange programming ideas in an easy to understand format.

Cunningham & Cunningham, the programming consultancy that would eventually host the PPR on its Internet domain, was incorporated in Salem, Oregon, on 1 November 1991, and is named after Ward and his wife, Karen R. Cunningham, a mathematician, school teacher, and school director. Cunningham & Cunningham registered their Internet domain, c2.com, on 23 October 1994. Ward created the Portland Pattern Repository on c2.com as a means to help object-oriented programmers publish their computer programming patterns by submitting them to him. Some of those programmers attended the OOPSLA and PLoP conferences about object-oriented programming, and posted their ideas on the PPR. The PPR is accompanied, on c2.com, by the first ever wiki, a collection of reader-modifiable Web pages, which is named WikiWikiWeb.
