= La Frikipedia =

Spanish-language parody of Wikipedia

Frikpedia
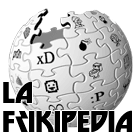
- Frikipedia's logo

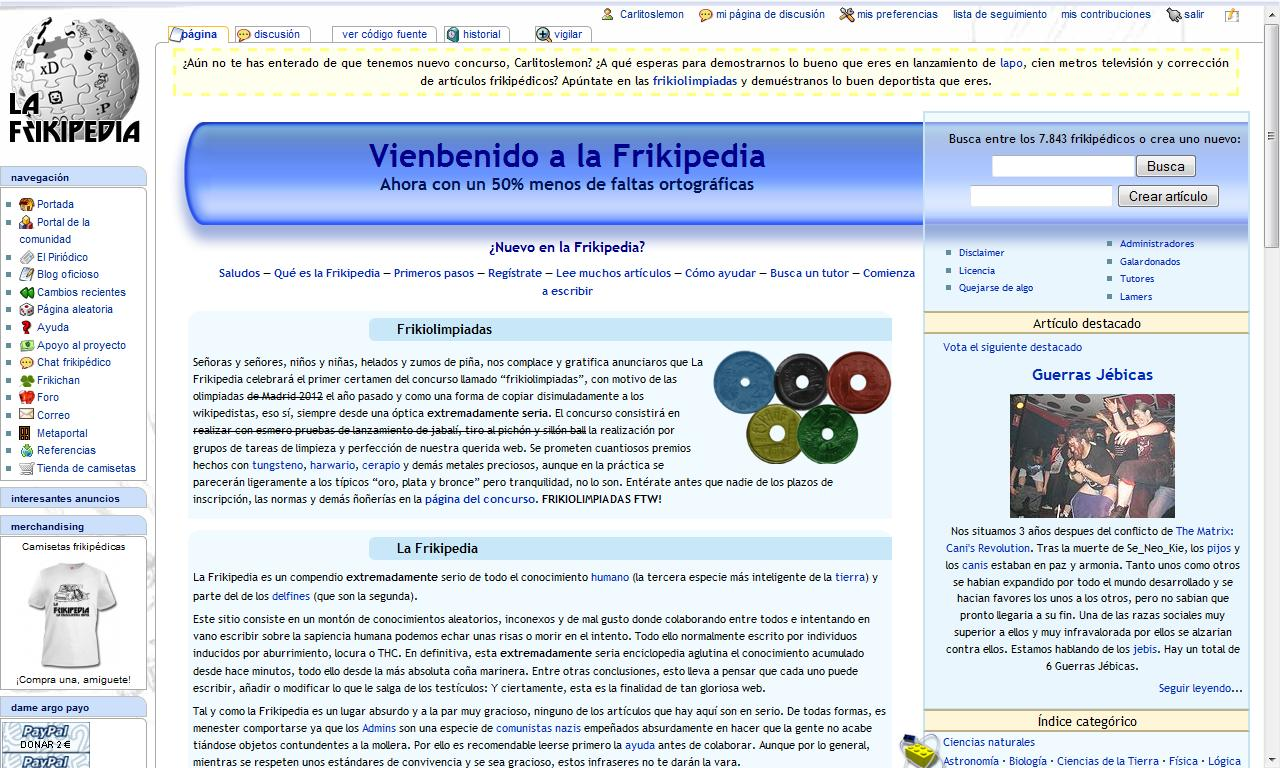
- Home page of La Frikipedia, the first parody of the Spanish Wikipedia.
- Website type: Encyclopedia
- Available in: Spanish
- Website: http://www.frikipedia.es
- Commercial: No
- Registration: Required to edit an article
- Launched: October 3, 2005
- Current status: Inactive

La Frikipedia was a Spanish-language parody of Wikipedia. Frikipedia can be translated into English as The Geekpedia or The Freakypedia, since the title comes from the anglicism freak. It is also called "the extremely serious encyclopedia" or the "useless encyclopedia". It currently has more than 8,000 articles. The Frikipedia is under the GNU Free Documentation License. In early 2006, the head of the Frikipedia decided to close the site after a complaint by the SGAE. It reopened on October 20, 2007.

== Closing and campaign to re-open ==
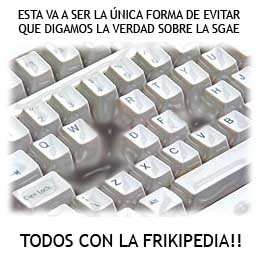
Campaign to re-open the Frikipedia.

In 2006, The General Society of Authors of Spain (Sociedad General de Autores y Editores, SGAE), sued La Frikipedia for "obscenities and insults", asking for between 9,000 and 12,000 euros in compensation. On February 3, 2006 La Frikipedia was closed as a result.

Following the closure of the website, a campaign was launched in support of La Frikipedia. In addition, the head of the Frikipedia opened a page where small donations collected two and five euros through the payment system PayPal with intended to cover travel expenses, lawyers and a hypothetical sentence.

After an agreement with the SGAE, Frikipedia reopened its site on February 26 without mentioning the entity in its pages. After the discomfort of many Internet users to this measure it closed within a few hours. In June 2006 it reopened in test mode, with no mention of SGAE; however, some of the offending articles were recovered using search engine caches and taken to the Uncyclopedia. This resulted in a significant increase in the number of items in the Spanish language branch of Uncyclopedia, which resulted in the brother project being called Inciclopedia with the articles rescued.

On November 8, 2007, the National Audience of Madrid confirmed the ruling that condemns the editor Vicente Herrera to pay 600 euros in compensation to the manager and his manager Pedro Farré and legal costs.

As of very late 2015 (around November–December), Frikipedia was closed down, saying that after ten years, the administrators finally decided after years of controversy to close it down.

== See also ==
- List of satirical news websites
- Uncyclopedia
- Wikipedia
