= Wiki Wiki Shuttle =

Free shuttle bus service at Honolulu International Airport

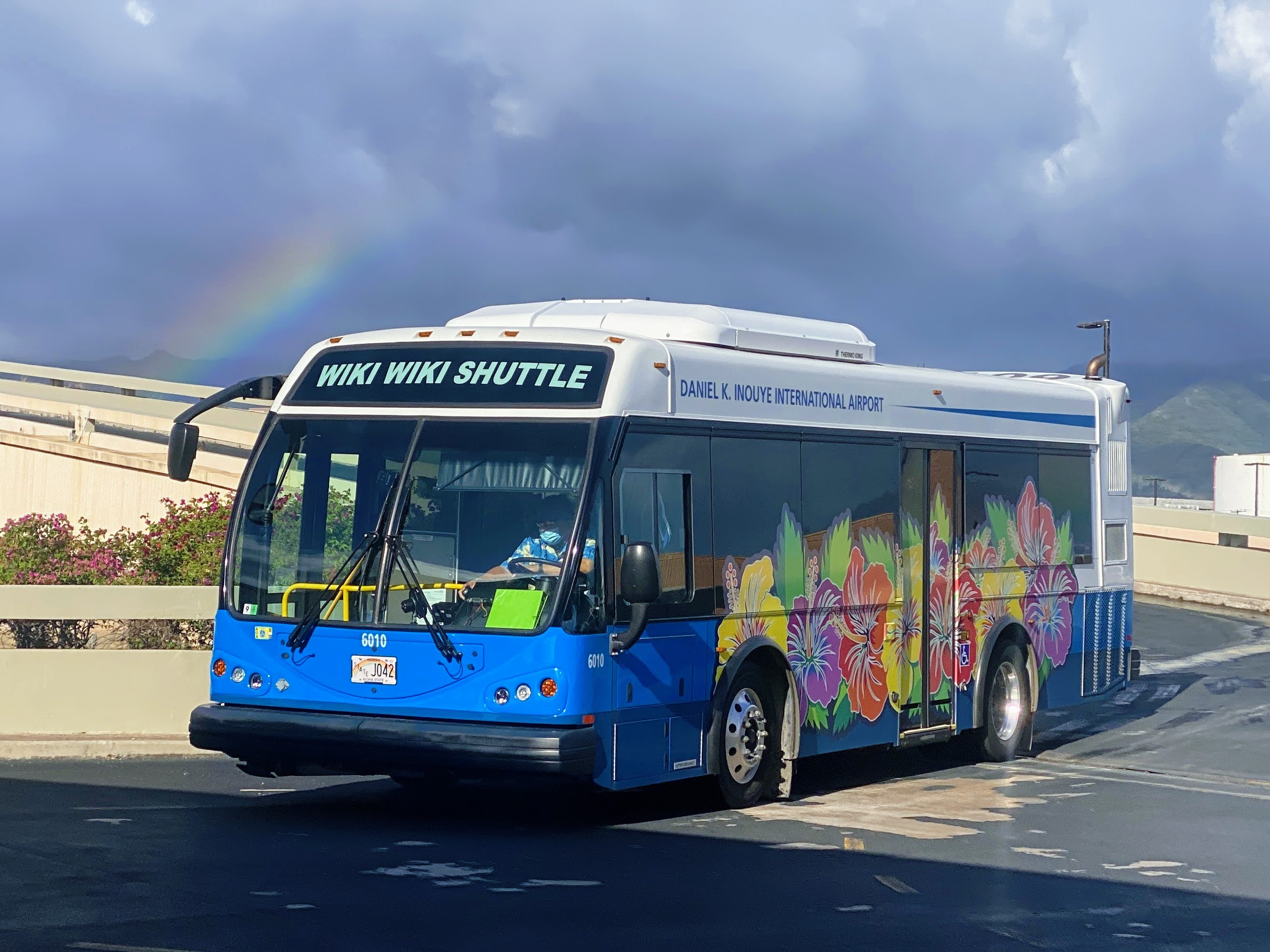
Wiki Wiki Shuttle bus in 2022

The Wiki Wiki Shuttle (lit. 'Very Fast Shuttle') is a free shuttle bus service at Daniel K. Inouye International Airport in Honolulu, Hawaii. Shuttles run between 6:00 a.m. and 10:00 p.m. local time, carrying people and baggage between the various terminals and gates.

In the Hawaiian language, the word "wiki" means quick. In 1994, the shuttle's name inspired American computer programmer Ward Cunningham to build the first ever user-editable website, WikiWikiWeb. The word wiki for a user-editable website thus derives from the shuttle's name, and is, by proxy, part of the etymology of the name Wikipedia.

== History ==
The "Wiki-Wiki Bus" service began in 1962, at the same time that the airport's new terminal opened, and used 16-seat minibuses that were painted in bright turquoise, white, and coral. The service was abandoned as uneconomical by 1963, but was reinstated in 1967. The lack of shuttle service had led to complaints from taxi drivers, who were being asked to make short trips between airport terminals.

In 2007, plans were announced to construct an air-conditioned walkway with a moving sidewalk as an alternative to the Wiki Wiki Shuttle for access to the international terminal, while replacing the outdated buses with new ones. The new walkway opened in October 2009.

The buses were formerly run by the Aircraft Services International Group (ASIG). In April 2009, the airport signed a new contract for the shuttle buses to be managed by Roberts Hawaii, and the signage on the shuttles was changed to "HNL shuttle". Despite this, new buses were added, and by 2013 they were once more labelled "Wiki Wiki".

In 2024, the Hawaii Department of Transportation announced the addition of a zero emission autonomous electric vehicle called Miki, which would supplement the Wiki Wiki shuttle. Each vehicle can seat up to 11 people, including an attendant and are considered ADA accessible. The vehicle runs at a pace of 10 MPH. Miki is the Hawaiian word for agile.

As of 2026, the buses are in service for both departures and arrivals.

== See also ==
- Chance RT-52, the bus originally used on the shuttle line
- TheBus, the public transportation service of Honolulu
- wikiwiki, definition that gave origin to WikiWikiWeb
