= NoteCards =

Hypertext-based personal knowledge base system

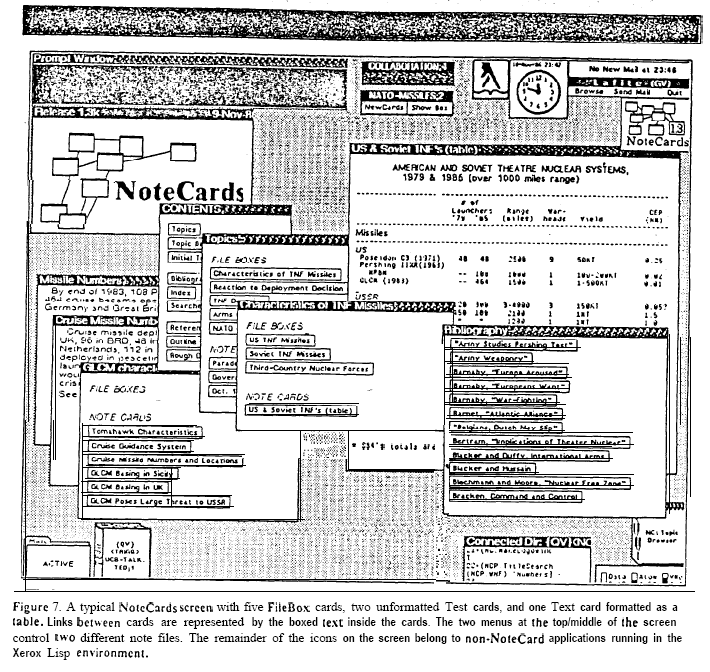
Scan of printed screenshot of NoteCards hypertext application

NoteCards was a hypertext-based personal knowledge base system developed at Xerox PARC by Randall Trigg, Frank Halasz and Thomas Moran in 1984. NoteCards was developed after Trigg's pioneering 1983 Ph.D. thesis on hypertext while at the University of Maryland College Park.

NoteCards was built to model four basic kinds of objects: notecards, links, browser card, and filebox. Each window is an analog of a cue card; window sizes may vary, but contents cannot scroll. Local and global maps are available through browsers. There are over 40 different nodes which support various media.

The basic construct in NoteCards is a semantic network composed of notecards connected by typed links. Each notecard contains an arbitrary amount of information embodied in text, graphics, images, or some other editable substance. Links are used to represent binary connections between cards. NoteCards provides two specialized types of cards, Browsers and FileBoxes, that help the user to manage networks of cards and links.

— "Notecards in a nutshell" (1987)

NoteCards was implemented in LISP on D-machine workstations from Xerox which used large, high-resolution displays. The NoteCards interface is event-driven. One interesting feature of NoteCards is that authors may use LISP commands to customize or create entirely new node types. The powerful programming language allows almost complete customization of the entire NoteCards work environment.

== Availability ==
NoteCards was available commercially from the Common Lisp software vendor Venue, compiled for Solaris 2.5 and 7 (untested on later versions) and Linux x86 with the X Window System.
