= WikiWikiWeb =

First user-editable website (launched 1995)

- The homepage of the WikiWikiWeb in 2003
- Website type: Wiki with focus on software design patterns
- Available in: English
- Headquarters: Portland, Oregon
- Owners: Cunningham & Cunningham, Inc.
- Creator: Ward Cunningham
- Website: wiki.c2.com
- Registration: Not implemented; users can edit using any name and optionally create a page about themselves under that name
- Launched: March 25, 1995; 31 years ago
- Current status: Active (Read-only indefinitely since February 1, 2015)

The WikiWikiWeb is the first wiki, or user-editable website. It was launched on 25 March 1995 by programmer Ward Cunningham and has been a read-only archive since 2015. The name WikiWikiWeb originally also applied to the wiki software that operated the website, which was later renamed to "WikiBase".

== Description ==
Cunningham devised the site as accompanying the Portland Pattern Repository website discussing software design patterns.

The name WikiWikiWeb originally also applied to the wiki software that operated the website, written in the Perl programming language and later renamed to "WikiBase" (Note: Not to be confused with Wikibase.).

Hyperlinks between pages on WikiWikiWeb are created by joining capitalized words together, a technique referred to as camel case. This convention of wiki markup formatting is still followed by some more recent wiki software, whereas others, such as the MediaWiki software that powers Wikipedia, allow links without camel case.

== History ==
The software and website were developed in 1994 by Cunningham in order to make the exchange of ideas between programmers easier. This concept was based on the ideas developed in HyperCard stacks that Cunningham built in the late 1980s. On March 25, 1995, he installed the software on his company's (Cunningham & Cunningham) website: c2.com. The site was frequently referred to as “Wiki”; a WikiWikiWeb FAQ described “Wiki” with a capital W as shorthand for the WikiWikiWeb.

In December 2014, WikiWikiWeb came under the attack of vandals, and had to be put into a read-only state. On February 1, 2015, Cunningham announced that the Wiki had been rewritten as a single-page application and migrated to the new Federated Wiki.

When moved to read-only, the WikiWikiWeb's Welcome Visitors page contained the following description in the first two paragraphs:

Welcome to WikiWikiWeb, also known as "Wiki". A lot of people had their first wiki experience here. This community has been around since 1995 and consists of many people. We always accept newcomers with valuable contributions. If you haven't used a wiki before, be prepared for a bit of CultureShock. The usefulness of Wiki is in the freedom, simplicity, and power it offers.
This site's primary focus is PeopleProjectsAndPatterns in SoftwareDevelopment. However, it is more than just an InformalHistoryOfProgrammingIdeas. It started there, but the theme has created a culture and DramaticIdentity all its own. All Wiki content is WorkInProgress. Most of all, this is a forum where people share ideas! It changes as people come and go. Much of the information here is subjective. If you are looking for a dedicated reference site, try WikiPedia; WikiIsNotWikipedia!

== Etymology ==
Cunningham came up with the name WikiWikiWeb because he remembered a Honolulu International Airport counter employee who told him to take the Wiki Wiki Shuttle, a shuttle bus line that runs between the airport's terminals. "Wiki Wiki" is a reduplication of "wiki", a Hawaiian language word for "quick". Cunningham's idea was to make WikiWikiWeb's pages quickly editable by its users. He initially thought about calling it "QuickWeb"; he later changed his mind and dubbed it "WikiWikiWeb".

== See also ==
- History of wikis
