= List of computer books =

List of computer-related books which have articles on Wikipedia for themselves or their writers.

== Programming ==
=== Ada ===
- John Barnes – Programming in Ada 2012

=== C ===
- Andrew Koenig – C Traps and Pitfalls
- Brian W. Kernighan – The C Programming Language
- Guy L. Steele Jr. – C: A Reference Manual
- Herbert Schildt – C, The Complete Reference
- Peter van der Linden – Expert C Programming: Deep C Secrets

=== C++ ===
- Andrei Alexandrescu – Modern C++ Design
- Bjarne Stroustrup – The C++ Programming Language, A Tour of C++, The Annotated C++ Reference Manual
- Herb Sutter – Exceptional C++, More Exceptional C++, Exceptional C++ Style, C++ Coding Standards
- John Paul Mueller – C++ All-In-One For Dummies
- Scott Meyers – Effective C++, More Effective C++, Effective Modern C++
- Stanley B. Lippman – Inside the C++ Object Model, C++ Gems: Programming Pearls from The C++ Report

=== C# ===
- Andrew Troelsen – Pro C# 10 with .NET 6: Foundational Principles and Practices in Programming
- Bill Wagner – Effective C#
- Jeff Prosise – Programming Microsoft .NET
- Herbert Schildt – C#: A Beginner's Guide and C# 4.0: The Complete Reference

=== Fortran ===
- Daniel D. McCracken – A Guide to Fortran Programming
- Elliot Koffman – Problem Solving and Program Design in Fortran
- Jeanne Clare Adams – Fortran 90 Handbook and Programmer's Guide to Fortran 90
- William H. Press – Numerical Recipes

=== Go ===
- Brian W. Kernighan – The Go Programming Language

=== Java ===
- Bruce Eckel – Thinking in Java
- James Gosling – The Java Programming Language
- Joshua Bloch – Effective Java
- Kathy Sierra – Head First Java
- Herbert Schildt – Java: The Complete Reference, Java: A Beginner's Guide, Java 2 Programmer's Reference

=== JavaScript ===
- Chris Minnick – JavaScript All-in-One For Dummies
- Douglas Crockford – JavaScript: The Good Parts and How JavaScript Works
- Danny Goodman – JavaScript Bible
- Jeremy Keith – DOM Scripting
- Laura Lemay – Laura Lemay's Web Workshop: JavaScript
- John Resig – Pro JavaScript Techniques and Secrets of the JavaScript Ninja
- John Smiley – Learn to Program with JavaScript

=== Lisp ===
- Guy L. Steele Jr. – Common Lisp the Language
- Patrick Henry Winston – Lisp (book)
- Paul Graham – On Lisp and ANSI Common Lisp
- Peter Norvig – Paradigms of AI Programming
- Peter Seibel – Practical Common Lisp
- Richard P. Gabriel – Performance and Evaluation of Lisp Systems
- Sonya Keene – Object-Oriented Programming in Common Lisp
- Harold Abelson, Gerald Jay Sussman, and Julie Sussman – Structure and Interpretation of Computer Programs

=== Perl ===
- brian d foy – Mastering Perl
- chromatic – Perl Best Practices, Perl Hacks, Perl Testing: A Developer's Notebook
- Damian Conway – Object Oriented Perl
- GNU Savannah – Perl Design Patterns Book
- Joseph N. Hall – Effective Perl Programming
- Larry Wall – Programming Perl
- Mark Jason Dominus – Higher-Order Perl
- Randal L. Schwartz – Intermediate Perl and Learning Perl
- Sriram Srinivasan – Advanced Perl Programming
- Tom Christiansen – Perl Cookbook and Programming Perl 2nd and 3rd editions

=== PHP ===
- Rasmus Lerdorf – Programming PHP
- Zak Greant – PHP Functions Essential Reference
- David Mercer – Beginning PHP5

=== Python ===
- Alex Martelli — Python in a Nutshell and Python Cookbook
- Mark Pilgrim – Dive into Python
- Naomi Ceder — The Quick Python Book
- Wes McKinney — Python for Data Analysis
- Zed Shaw – Learn Python the Hard Way

=== R ===
- David G. Robinson — Text Mining with R
- Dirk Eddelbuettel – Seamless R and C++ Integration with Rcpp
- Hadley Wickham – Advanced R
- John Chambers – Software for data analysis programming with R
- John Fox – Using the R Commander: A Point-and-Click Interface for R
- Joseph Schmuller - R All-in-One For Dummies
- Paul Teetor - R Cookbook
- Roger Bivand – Applied Spatial Data Analysis with R
- Yihui Xie – Dynamic Documents with R and knitr

=== Ruby ===
- Andy Hunt and Dave Thomas – Programming Ruby
- Sandi Metz — Practical Object-Oriented Design in Ruby
- Sam Ruby, Dave Thomas, David Heinemeier Hansson – Agile Web Development with Rails
- why the lucky stiff – why's (poignant) Guide to Ruby
- Yukihiro Matsumoto — Ruby, Ruby in a Nutshell, and The Ruby Programming Language
- Zed Shaw — Learn Ruby the Hard Way

=== SQL ===
- C. J. Date – An Introduction to Database Systems
- Hugh Darwen – Databases, Types and The Relational Model: the Third Manifesto
- Ben Forta – SQL in 10 Minutes, Sams Teach Yourself
- Joe Celko – Joe Celko's SQL for Smarties

=== Visual Basic ===
- John Smiley – Learn to Program with Visual Basic 6
- Michael Halvorson – Microsoft Visual Basic 4 Step by Step
- Dan Rahmel – Visual Basic .NET Reference Book
- Clayton Walnum – The Complete Idiot's Guide to Visual Basic 6
- Mitchell Waite – Visual Basic How To

== Algorithms ==
- Donald Knuth – The Art of Computer Programming
- Ellis Horowitz – Fundamentals of Computer Algorithms
- Henry S. Warren, Jr. – Hacker's Delight
- Niklaus Wirth – Algorithms + Data Structures = Programs and Systematic Programming
- Maurice Wilkes, David Wheeler, and Stanley Gill – The Preparation of Programs for an Electronic Digital Computer
- Maxime Crochemore and Wojciech Rytter – Jewels of Stringology
- Nachum Dershowitz and Edward Reingold – Calendrical Calculations
- Pedro Domingos – The Master Algorithm: How the Quest for the Ultimate Learning Machine Will Remake Our World
- Thomas H. Cormen – Algorithms Unlocked
- William H. Press, Saul A. Teukolsky, and Brian P. Flannery – Numerical Recipes
- Jon Bentley – Programming Pearls

== Compilers ==
- Alfred Aho and Jeffrey Ullman – Principles of Compiler Design
- Alfred Aho, Monica S. Lam, Ravi Sethi, and Jeffrey Ullman – Compilers: Principles, Techniques, and Tools
- Andrew Appel – Modern Compiler Implementation in ML, Modern Compiler Implementation in Java, Modern Compiler Implementation in C, and Compiling with Continuations
- Keith D. Cooper and Linda Torczon – Engineering a Compiler
- David Gries – Compiler Construction for Digital Computers
- Niklaus Wirth – Compiler Construction and Project Oberon: The Design of an Operating System and Compiler
- Steven Muchnick – Advanced Compiler Design and Implementation
- William Wulf, Richard K. Johnson, Charles B. Weinstock, and Charles Geschke – The Design of an Optimizing Compiler

== Cryptocurrencies ==
- Alex Tapscott – Blockchain Revolution: How the Technology Behind Bitcoin is Changing Money, Business, and the World
- Andreas Antonopoulos – Mastering Bitcoin, Mastering Ethereum, and The Internet of Money
- Ben Mezrich – Bitcoin Billionaires
- David Gerard – Attack of the 50-foot Blockchain
- Nathaniel Popper – Digital Gold: Bitcoin and the Inside Story of the Misfits and Millionaires Trying to Reinvent Money
- Saifedean Ammous – The Bitcoin Standard
- Vitalik Buterin – Proof of Stake: The Making of Ethereum and the Philosophy of Blockchains

== Cryptography ==
- Craig P. Bauer – Unsolved!
- David Kahn (writer) – The Codebreakers
- John Falconer – Cryptomenysis Patefacta
- Leo Marks – Between Silk and Cyanide
- Matt Curtin – Brute Force: Cracking the Data Encryption Standard
- Simon Singh – The Code Book
- Steven Levy – Crypto
- William F. Friedman – Military Cryptanalytics

== Unix ==
- Brian W. Kernighan and Rob Pike – The Unix Programming Environment
- Eric Raymond – The Art of Unix Programming
- John Lions – A Commentary on the UNIX Operating System
- Stephen R. Bourne – The Unix System
- W. Richard Stevens – Advanced Programming in the Unix Environment

== Linux ==
- Bruce Perens – Bruce Perens' Open Source Series
- Eric S. Raymond – The Cathedral and the Bazaar
- Gerard Beekmans – Linux from Scratch
- Glyn Moody – Rebel Code: Linux and the Open Source Revolution
- Jonathan Oxer – Ubuntu Hacks
- Kenneth Brown – Samizdat: And Other Issues Regarding the 'Source' of Open Source Code
- Michael Kerrisk – The Linux Programming Interface
- Olaf Kirch & Terry Dawson – Linux Network Administrator's Guide

== Artificial intelligence ==
- Allen Newell – Unified Theories of Cognition
- Brian Christian – The Alignment Problem
- James Barrat – Our Final Invention
- James Lovelock – Novacene: The Coming Age of Hyperintelligence
- Janelle Shane – You Look Like a Thing and I Love You: How AI Works and Why It's Making the World a Weirder Place
- Jeff Hawkins – On Intelligence: How a New Understanding of the Brain will Lead to the Creation of Truly Intelligent Machines
- Jonathan Birch – The Edge of Sentience: Risk and Precaution in Humans, Other Animals, and AI
- John Brockman – Possible Minds: Twenty-five Ways of Looking at AI
- Kai-Fu Lee – AI Superpowers
- Kate Crawford – Atlas of AI: Power, Politics, and the Planetary Costs of Artificial Intelligence
- Max Tegmark – Life 3.0
- Marcus Hutter – Universal Artificial Intelligence: Sequential Decisions Based on Algorithmic Probability
- Martin Ford (author) - Architects of Intelligence: The truth about AI from the people building it
- Marvin Minsky – The Emotion Machine and Society of Mind
- Melanie Mitchell – Artificial Intelligence: A Guide for Thinking Humans
- Meredith Broussard – Artificial Unintelligence: How Computers Misunderstand the World
- Ray Kurzweil – The Age of Intelligent Machines, The Age of Spiritual Machines, The Singularity Is Nearer, How to Create a Mind
- Richard Dooling – Rapture for the Geeks: When AI Outsmarts IQ
- Roger Penrose – The Emperor's New Mind and Shadows of the Mind: A Search for the Missing Science of Consciousness
- Stan Franklin – Artificial Minds
- Stuart J. Russell – Human Compatible

=== Machine learning and deep learning ===
- Christopher Bishop – Pattern Recognition and Machine Learning
- Ian Goodfellow and Yoshua Bengio – Deep Learning
- John Paul Mueller and Luca Massaron - Machine Learning For Dummies
- Marvin Minsky and Seymour Papert – Perceptrons
- Yann LeCun – Quand La Machine Apprend

== Quantum computing ==
- Scott Aaronson – Quantum Computing Since Democritus
- Jack Hidary – Quantum Computing: An Applied Approach
- George Johnson – A Shortcut Through Time: The Path to the Quantum Computer
- N. David Mermin – Quantum Computer Science: An Introduction
- Michael Nielsen and Isaac Chuang – Quantum Computation and Quantum Information
- Eleanor Rieffel and Wolfgang Polak – Quantum Computing: A Gentle Introduction
- Seth Lloyd – Programming the Universe

== Other / general programming ==
- Andrew S. Tanenbaum – Modern Operating Systems and Operating Systems: Design and Implementation
- Andy Hunt and Dave Thomas – The Pragmatic Programmer
- Benjamin C. Pierce – Types and Programming Languages
- Bertrand Meyer – Object-Oriented Software Construction
- Bryan O'Sullivan, Don Stewart, and John Goerzen – Real World Haskell
- Brian W. Kernighan and Rob Pike – The Practice of Programming
- Brian W. Kernighan – The AWK Programming Language and The Elements of Programming Style
- Tony Hoare and He Jifeng – Unifying Theories of Programming
- Charles Petzold – Code: The Hidden Language of Computer Hardware and Software
- Chris DiBona – Open Sources and Open Sources 2.0
- Chris Wiggins and Matthew L. Jones – How Data Happened
- Claude Shannon – A Mathematical Theory of Communication
- Diomidis Spinellis – Code Reading
- Danny Hillis – The Pattern on the Stone
- Edward Yourdon – Rise and Resurrection of the American Programmer and other publications
- Ellen Ullman – Close to the Machine
- Fred Brooks – The Mythical Man-Month
- Gang of Four – Design Patterns
- Geoffrey James – The Tao of Programming
- Gerald M. Weinberg – The Psychology of Computer Programming
- Gregor Hohpe and Bobby Woolf – Enterprise Integration Patterns
- Ivo D. Dinov – Data Science and Predictive Analytics
- Jack Copeland, Jonathan Bowen, Robin Wilson – The Turing Guide
- Jean E. Sammet – Programming Languages: History and Fundamentals
- Jean-Raymond Abrial – The B-Book
- Joel Spolsky – The Best Software Writing I
- Jon Gertner — The Idea Factory
- Joshua Pearce – Open-Source Lab
- Keith Curtis – After the Software Wars
- Martin Fowler – Refactoring: Improving the Design of Existing Code and Patterns of Enterprise Application Architecture
- Marvin Minsky and Seymour Papert – Perceptrons: An Introduction to Computational Geometry
- Michael Garey and David S. Johnson – Computers and Intractability
- Michael Halvorson – Learn BASIC Now
- Michael Sipser – Introduction to the Theory of Computation
- Myron W. Krueger – Artificial Reality
- Narendra M. Thumbhekodige – The Oracle J2EE Companion
- Neal Stephenson – In the Beginning... Was the Command Line
- Nicole Forsgren – Accelerate: The Science of Lean Software and DevOps
- Pekka Himanen and Linus Torvalds (epilogue) – The Hacker Ethic and the Spirit of the Information Age
- Pattern-Oriented Software Architecture
- Paul Graham – Hackers & Painters
- Peter Norvig – Paradigms of AI Programming
- Peter Seibel – Coders at Work
- Randi J. Rost — OpenGL Shading Language and X and MOTIF Quick Reference Guide
- Richard M. Stallman – Free Software, Free Society
- Richard P. Gabriel – Patterns of Software and Innovation Happens Elsewhere
- Robert C. Martin – Clean Code
- Rodnay Zaks – Programming the Z80
- Sam Williams – Free as in Freedom
- Scott Rosenberg – Dreaming in Code
- Steve McConnell – Code Complete
- Stephen Wolfram – A New Kind of Science
- Tom DeMarco and Tim Lister – Peopleware: Productive Projects and Teams
- William Brown – AntiPatterns: Refactoring Software, Architectures, and Projects in Crisis

== Internet ==
- Douglas Rushkoff — Cyberia: Life in the Trenches of Hyperspace
- Sam Halabi — Internet Routing Architectures
- Jack Goldsmith, Tim Wu — Who Controls the Internet? Illusions of Borderless World
- Tim Berners-Lee — Weaving the Web

== Semiconductors ==
- Chris Miller — Chip War
- Michael Riordan, Lillian Hoddeson — Crystal Fire: The Birth of the Information Age
- William Shockley — Electrons and Holes in Semiconductors with Applications to Transistor Electronics
- Paul Horowitz, Winfield Hill — The Art of Electronics

== Hackers and hacker culture ==
- Bill Blunden – The Rootkit Arsenal
- Bill Landreth and Howard Rheingold – Out of the Inner Circle
- Bruce Sterling – The Hacker Crackdown
- Clifford Stoll – The Cuckoo's Egg
- Cory Doctorow – Little Brother
- Douglas Thomas – Hacker Culture
- Daniel Golden and Renee Dudley – The Ransomware Hunting Team
- Eric S. Raymond – The New Hacker's Dictionary and Revenge of the Hackers
- Glyn Moody – Rebel Code
- Hugo Cornwall – The Hacker's Handbook
- Jon "Smibbs" Erickson – Hacking: The Art of Exploitation
- Joseph Menn – Fatal System Error
- Julian Assange – Cypherpunks: Freedom and the Future of the Internet
- Kevin Mitnick – Ghost in the Wires and The Art of Intrusion
- Kevin Poulsen – Kingpin: How One Hacker Took Over the Billion-Dollar Cybercrime Underground
- Linus Torvalds and David Diamond – Just for Fun: The Story of an Accidental Revolutionary
- Malcolm Nance – The Plot to Hack America
- Open Sources: Voices from the Open Source Revolution
- Sam Williams – Free as in Freedom
- Scott J. Shapiro – Fancy Bear Goes Phishing
- Sean Bodmer, Max Kilger, Gregory Carpenter, and Jade Jones – Reverse Deception
- Steven Levy – Hackers: Heroes of the Computer Revolution
- Suelette Dreyfus – Underground: Tales of Hacking, Madness and Obsession on the Electronic Frontier
- William Cheswick and Steven M. Bellovin – Firewalls and Internet Security

== See also ==
- American Graphics Institute - Educational content
- Category:Computer books
- Head First (book series)
- Linux Documentation Project
- List of computer magazines
- List of programmers
- List of computer science journals
- List of mathematics books
- List of software programming journals
- List of artificial intelligence journals
- List of books in computational geometry
- Norton Guides
- Programming education
- Prentice Hall International Series in Computer Science
- Wikibooks computer programming resources

=== Textbooks ===
- Artificial Intelligence: A Modern Approach
- Artificial Intelligence (textbook)
- Compilers: Principles, Techniques, and Tools
- Computer Graphics: Principles and Practice
- Concepts, Techniques, and Models of Computer Programming - MIT Press
- Concrete Mathematics: A Foundation for Computer Science
- Core Python Programming
- Essentials of Programming Languages
- How to Design Programs
- How to Solve it by Computer
- Introduction to Algorithms
- Introduction to Automata Theory, Languages, and Computation
- Lisp (textbook)
- Operating System Concepts
- Principles of Compiler Design
- Principles of Model Checking
- Programming Languages: Application and Interpretation
- Quantum Computation and Quantum Information
- Reversing: Secrets of Reverse Engineering
- The Visualization Handbook
- Walls and Mirrors

=== Essays / other ===
- Satoshi Nakamoto — The Bitcoin Whitepaper
- Electronic Workshops in Computing
- Handbook of Automated Reasoning — survey articles on automated reasoning by MIT Press
- Lecture Notes in Computer Science
- Chris Lattner — LLVM: A Compilation Framework for Lifelong Program Analysis & Transformation
- No Silver Bullet
- The Hacker Manifesto
- Bill Gates — "The Internet Tidal Wave"
- The Magic Cauldron
- David Heinemeier Hansson (DHH) — The Rails Doctrine
- The Zen of Python
- Techno-Optimist Manifesto
- Turtle Geometry
