= Artificial Unintelligence =

Artificial Unintelligence may refer to:

- Artificial stupidity, a computer science term
- "Artificial Unintelligence" (The Mighty B!), a 2008 television episode
- Artificial Unintelligence: How Computers Misunderstand the World, a 2018 book by Meredith Broussard
