= John Smiley =

John Smiley may refer to:

- John Smiley (baseball) (born 1965), Major League Baseball pitcher
- John Smiley (author), technology author and teacher
- John S. Smiley (1885–1945), Canadian politician in the Nova Scotia House of Assembly

== See also ==
- John Smillie (disambiguation)
