= Troelsen =

Troelsen is a surname. Notable people with the surname include:

- Andrew Troelsen, Technology manager and author
- Thomas Troelsen (born 1981), Danish singer, songwriter, and producer
- Tommy Troelsen (1940–2021), Danish football player, manager, and television presenter
- Trine Troelsen (born 1985), Danish team handball player
