= Deciding What's True =

2016 book by Lucas Graves

- First edition
- Author: Lucas Graves
- Subject: Fact-checking
- Publisher: Columbia University Press
- Publication date: 2016
- Pages: 320
- ISBN: 978-0-231-17507-4

Deciding What's True: The Rise of Political Fact-checking in American Journalism is a 2016 book by Lucas Graves about the role of fact-checking in journalism.

== Reception ==
David Greenberg of Journal of Communication said that the book is "Well-researched, carefully argued, and lucidly written" and "does an excellent job of sorting out the messy questions of truth and false-hood, fact and opinion, in contemporary politics and journalism." Tim P. Vos of Journalism & Mass Communication Quarterly said that the book "brings a keenly analytical eye to [its] subject matter, raising profound issues about the nature and role of journalism." and that "if there is not a place for this book in a course in your journalism program, it is time for a program review."

Bente Kalsnes of Digital Journalism praised the book for its "ethnographic perspective" that "offers readers detailed insights into a new journalistic genre and details of a journalistic institution under development.", but criticized the book for not offering "a typology of the findings", for being "limited to U.S. fact-checking outlets", and for not answering the question: "how should the fact-checking 'movement' affect the curricula of j-schools and journalism education?". Martin Conboy of The International Journal of Press/Politics said that the book is "meticulously researched and fluently written", that "The author should be congratulated on his ability to weave thorough academic scholarship lightly enough so that anecdotal and 'messy' fieldwork can be appreciated as an integral part of the project.", and that "there are enough brief examples [in the book] of other national varieties to indicate that the anxieties within journalism that have given rise to fact-checking are far from a uniquely American problem."

Stuart Allan of Media, Culture & Society said that "There is much to admire in Deciding What's True, a pioneering effort to provide a rigorous, in-depth assessment and critique of the fact-checking movement's intervention. Evidently informing its discussion are more than 200 hours of fieldwork and interviews conducted by Graves over a 5-year period, yet the resultant wealth of data is consistently handled with nuance, sophistication and self-reflexivity.

Scott McLemee of Inside Higher Ed said that the book "traces how media outlets' internal fact-checking has morphed into something almost antithetical: the very public evaluation of factual assertions made by politicians and other news figures". Kirkus Reviews called the book "a reasoned and reasonable text that will appeal—due to its scholarly tone, diction, and format—mostly to an academic audience.", concluding that the book is "A keenly observed visit to a new world whose geography we can now better comprehend."
