= Lad (video game) =

2012 video game

- Developer: Keith Curtis
- Publisher: Keith Curtis
- Platforms: iOS, Android
- Release: September 12, 2012
- Genre: Puzzle

Lad is an iOS puzzle game by American indie developer Keith Curtis, released on September 12, 2012.

== Critical reception ==
Lad has received a mixed response, garnering a Metacritic score of 42% based on 7 critic reviews.

148Apps said "LAD is an interesting game that takes a great deal of risk to present a difficult challenge to the player. In my opinion, though, it just wasn't worth it".

TouchGen said "I rather think that during development someone pointed out that this might become a Limbo for iOS. At that time it seems creativity went out the window, and we ended up with level design and controls completely subpar. A shame, as LAD could probably have been a much more interesting game than "that game that looks like Limbo", which it is now".

AppSpy wrote " Don't be fooled by its appearance - LAD may look like Limbo, but it's more gaming purgatory than heaven", while HyperMagazine described it as "An extremely cumbersome, irritating game". Pocket Gamer UK said "As depressing to play as it is to look at, LAD is a nightmarishly frustrating platform-puzzler", and Slide To Play wrote "LAD is an unplayable mess and should not be bought by anyone".
