= Hilary Mason (entrepreneur) =

American entrepreneur

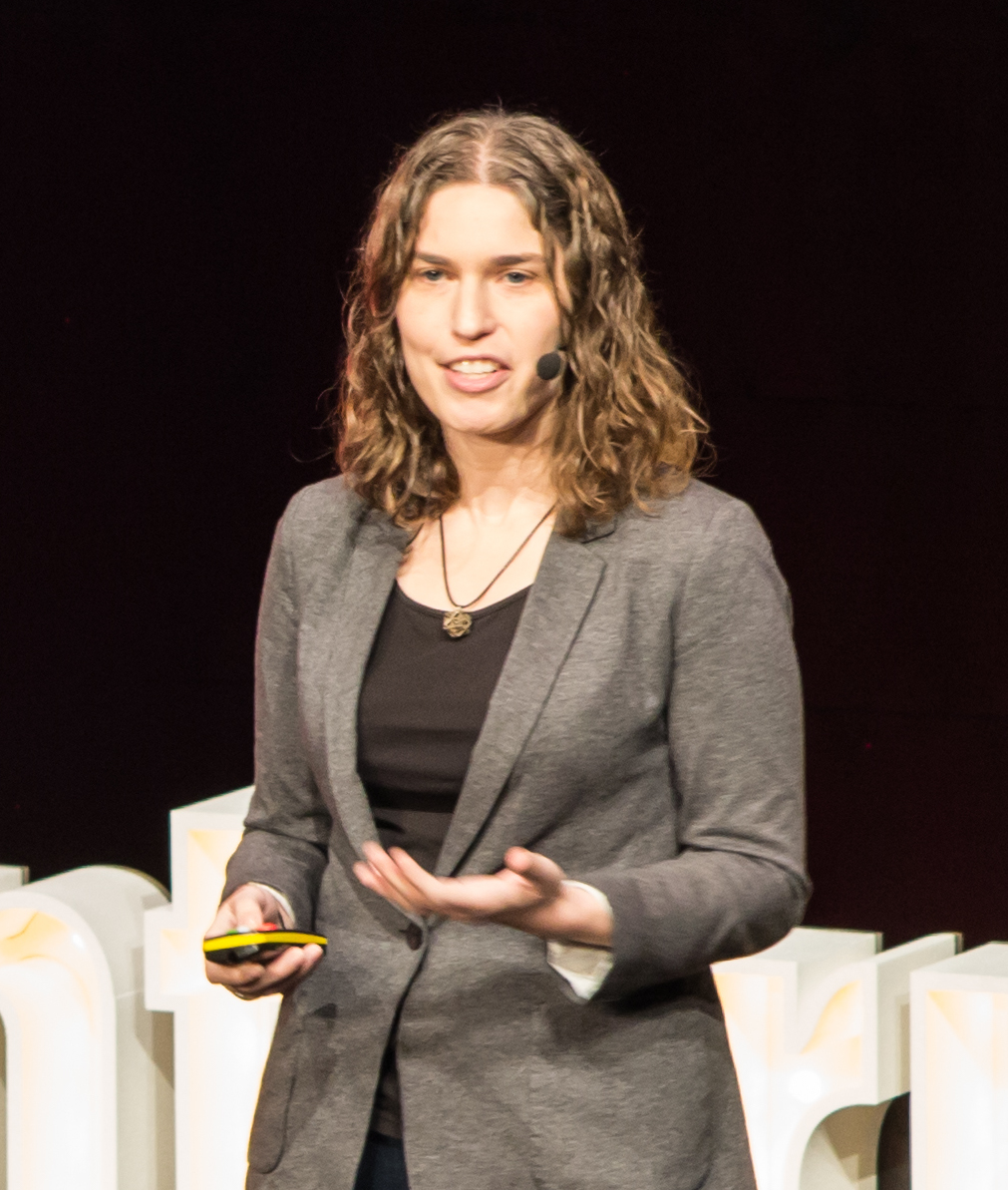
- Hilary Mason, 2015
- Born: New York City
- Education: Grinnell College; Brown University
- Awards: Fortune 40 Under 40
- Website: hilarymason.com

Hilary Mason is an American entrepreneur and data scientist. She is the co-founder of the startup Fast Forward Labs.

== Early life and education ==
Mason was born in New York City, and graduated from Grinnell College with a B.A. in computer science in 2000, and attended Brown University.

== Career ==
In 2010, she co-founded hackNY, a non-profit that helps integrate engineering students into the startup community in New York City. After a few years working as Chief Scientist at bitly, she quit the company in 2014 and co-founded Fast Forward Labs with Micha Gorelick, another former bitly data scientist. She continues working as a data scientist at Accel. On September 7, 2017, Cloudera announced that it had acquired Fast Forward Labs, and that Mason would become Cloudera's Vice President of Research.

She has been interviewed by TechRepublic, Forbes, Wall Street Journal, ProgrammableWeb and others. She has further featured in both Glamour (magazine) and Scientific American

She has also been a member of Mayor Bloomberg's Technology and Innovation Advisory Council. In addition, Mason is a prominent member of NYCResistor, a hacker collective located in Brooklyn.

=== Fast Forward Labs ===
Fast Forward Labs specializes in machine learning intelligence research. Mason is the CEO of the Fast Forward Labs until the acquisition, on September 7, 2017 by Cloudera, a US open-source software company that offers support, training and software to business clients. Cloudera extended this offer due to FFL's experience and expertise in applying machine learning to practical business problems and their commitment to continual academic and industrial research surveys on new techniques. Mason explained that the merger of FFL with Cloudera would enable further and accelerated research opportunities on a larger platform.

=== Awards ===
Mason received the TechFellows Engineering Leadership award in 2012 worth $100,000. She was also on the Fortune 40 under 40 Ones to Watch list in 2011, as well as Crain's New York 40 under Forty list.

She was named within the Top 100 most creative people in business by Fast Company.
