= LinuxFocus (magazine) =

LinuxFocus was a bi-monthly webzine covering Linux. It was part of the Linux Documentation Project, and a sister webzine of the Linux Gazette. Each issue was published in a number of languages and was distributed free.

== History and profile ==
LinuxFocus was started in November 1997 by Miguel Angel Sepulveda, primarily as a resource for Linux users in non-English speaking countries. Later, Guido Socher became project leader. The last article was published in 2005.

LinuxFocus is issued under the terms of the GNU Free Documentation License.

== See also ==
- Computer magazine
