= How Data Happened =

2023 non-fiction book by Chris Wiggins

How Data Happened: A History from the Age of Reason to the Age of Algorithms
- Author: Chris Wiggins; Matthew L. Jones
- Publisher: W. W. Norton and Company
- Publication date: 2023
- ISBN: 978-1-324-00673-2

How Data Happened: A History from the Age of Reason to the Age of Algorithms is a 2023 non-fiction book written by Columbia University professors Chris Wiggins and Matthew L. Jones. The book explores the history of data and statistics from the end of the 18th century to the present day.

== Content ==
The book starts at the end of the 18th century, when European states began tabulating physical resources, and ends at the present day, when algorithms manipulate our personal information as a commodity. It looks at the rise of data and statistics, and how early statistical methods were used to justify eugenics, quantify supposed racial differences, and develop military and industrial applications. The authors also discuss the impact of the internet and e-commerce on data collection, the rise of data science, and the consequences of government-run surveillance systems collecting vast amounts of personal data for customized, targeted advertising. They emphasize the importance of privacy and democracy and propose remedies to the problems caused by mass data collection, including stronger regulation of the tech industry and collective action by its employees. The book is a historical analysis that provides context for understanding the debates surrounding data and its control.

The book has 336 pages and was published in 2023 by W. W. Norton & Company.
