= Meredith Broussard =

Data journalism professor

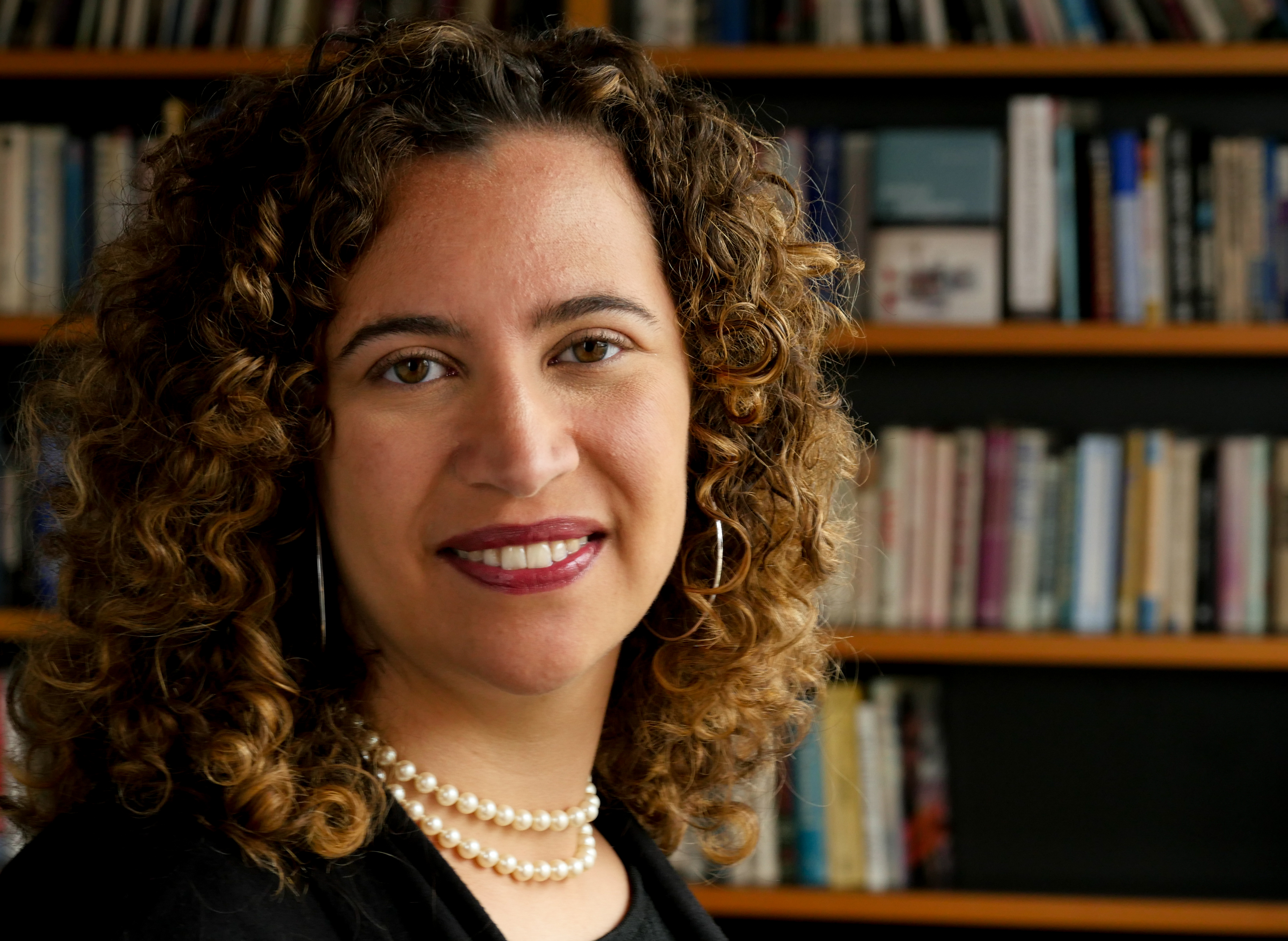
- Broussard in 2018
- Born: United States
- Education: Columbia University, Harvard University
- Occupations: Associate Professor, Arthur L. Carter Journalism Institute NYU
- Known for: Research in artificial intelligence and investigative reporting; coining the term "technochauvinism"
- Website: meredithbroussard.com

Meredith Broussard is a data journalism professor at the Arthur L. Carter Journalism Institute at New York University. Her research focuses on the role of artificial intelligence in journalism.

== Career ==
Broussard was previously a features editor at The Philadelphia Inquirer, and a software developer at the AT&T Bell Labs and MIT Media Lab. Broussard has published features and essays in many outlets including The Atlantic, Harper’s Magazine, and Slate Magazine. She is the author of the nonfiction books Artificial Unintelligence: How Computers Misunderstand the World and More Than a Glitch: Confronting Race, Gender, and Ability Bias in Tech.

As a fellow at the Tow Center for Digital Journalism at the Columbia University Graduate School of Journalism, she built Bailiwick, a tool designed to uncover data-driven campaign finance stories, created for the United States presidential election of 2016.

Currently, Broussard is an associate professor at the Arthur L. Carter Journalism Institute of New York University, a research director of the NYU Alliance for Public Interest Technology, and an advisory board member of the Center for Critical Race and Digital Studies.

Broussard appeared as herself in the 2020 Netflix documentary, Coded Bias, which follows researchers and advocates as they explore how algorithms encode and propagate bias. She has been interviewed on a number of topics, including algorithmic bias, for several media outlets, including The Verge, Los Angeles Times, The New York Times, and Harvard Magazine.

== Publications ==
Broussard has published a wide range of books examining the intersection of technology and social practice. Her book Artificial Unintelligence: How Computers Misunderstand the World, published in April 2018 by MIT Press, examines the limits of technology in solving social problems. Her book More than a Glitch: Confronting Race, Gender, and Ability Bias in Tech was published in March 2023. She has been profiled in Communications of the ACM and cited by Christopher Mims of The Wall Street Journal as an expert in the future of self-driving car technology. Other publications and works of hers include:

- "Broken Technology Hurts Democracy"
- "Challenges of archiving and preserving born-digital news applications"
- "How to Think About Bots"
- "New Airbnb Data Reveals Some Hosts Are Raking In Big Bucks"
- "The Irony of Writing Online About Digital Preservation"
- "The Secret Lives of Hackathon Junkies"
- "When Cops Check Facebook"
- "Big Data in Practice: Enabling Computational Journalism Through Code-Sharing and Reproducible Research Methods"
- "Preserving News Apps Presents Huge Challenges"
- "Why Poor Schools Can't Win at Standardized Testing"
- "Artificial Intelligence for Investigative Reporting"

== Selected academic publications ==
- Broussard, Meredith. "Artificial intelligence for investigative reporting: Using an expert system to enhance journalists’ ability to discover original public affairs stories." Digital Journalism 3.6 (2015): 814-831.
- Broussard, Meredith, et al. "Artificial intelligence and journalism." Journalism & Mass Communication Quarterly 96.3 (2019): 673–695.
- Boss, Katherine, and Meredith Broussard. "Challenges of archiving and preserving born-digital news applications." IFLA journal 43.2 (2017): 150–157.
- Broussard, Meredith. "Big Data in Practice: Enabling computational journalism through code-sharing and reproducible research methods." Digital Journalism 4.2 (2016): 266–279.
- Broussard, Meredith. "Teaching coding in journalism schools: Considerations for a secure technological infrastructure." Computation+ Journalism 2015 Conference. 2015.
