= Chris Wiggins (data scientist) =

American data scientist

- Education: Columbia College (New York) (BA); Princeton University (PhD)
- Employer(s): Columbia University; CNN
- Known for: co-founding hackNY; Chief Data Scientist at The New York Times

Chris Wiggins is an associate professor of applied mathematics at Columbia University in New York City. In 2010 he co-founded hackNY, a nonprofit organization focused on connecting students with startups in New York City. From 2013 to 2026, he was the Chief Data Scientist at The New York Times. Since 2026 he has been the head of machine learning and AI science at CNN.

== Career ==
In 2017, Chris Wiggins, along with Matthew L. Jones, introduced a new course to Columbia called "Data: Past, Present, Future". The course syllabus, lectures, labs, and resources are available online. As of May 2026, he is the Adviser to the Dean for AI Strategy at Columbia College.

=== Notable works ===
- "ARACNE: an algorithm for the reconstruction of gene regulatory networks in a mammalian cellular context"

=== Awards ===
In 2007, he received the Janette and Armen Avanessians Diversity Award at Columbia University.

== Bibliography ==
- Spector, Alfred Z.; Norvig, Peter; Wiggins, Chris; Wing, Jeannette M. (2022). Data Science in Context: Foundations, Challenges, Opportunities. Cambridge University Press. ISBN 9781009272230.
- Jones, Matthew L.; Wiggins, Chris (2023). How Data Happened: A History from the Age of Reason to the Age of Algorithms. W.W. Norton. ISBN 9781324006732.
