= John Smillie =

John Smillie may refer to:

- John Smillie (soccer)
- John Smillie (mathematician)
- John Smillie (boxer)

== See also ==
- John Smilie, Irish-American politician
- John Smiley (disambiguation)
