= Linux Network Administrator's Guide =

Book on running Unix networks

Linux Network Administrator's Guide (1st Edition)
- Author: Olaf Kirch
- Publisher: O′Reilly
- Publication date: 1995
- ISBN: 978-1565920873

Linux Network Administrator's Guide (2nd Edition)
- Author: Olaf Kirch & Terry Dawson
- Publisher: O'Reilly
- Publication date: June 2000
- ISBN: 978-1565924000
- Website: http://www.tldp.org/LDP/nag2/index.html

Linux Network Administrator's Guide (3rd Edition)
- Author: Tony Bautts, Terry Dawson, Gregor N. Purdy
- Publisher: O'Reilly
- Publication date: February 2005
- ISBN: 978-0596005481

The Linux Network Administrator's Guide is a book on setting up and running Unix and Linux networks. The first and second editions are freely available in electronic form under the GFDL. It was originally produced by Olaf Kirch and others as part of the Linux Documentation Project with help from O'Reilly. The second edition, from Terry Dawson, was released June 2000. The third edition of the guide was written by Tony Bautts, with assistance from Gregor N. Purdy in February 2005, but is not freely available like the previous two versions.

== Contents ==
It includes the following sections:

- Introduction to Networking
- Issues of TCP/IP Networking
- Configuring the Networking Hardware
- Setting up the Serial Hardware
- Configuring TCP/IP Networking
- Name Service and Resolver Configuration
- Serial Line IP
- The Point-to-Point Protocol
- Various Network Applications
- The Network Information System
- Network Address Translation
- The Network File System
- Managing UUCP
- Electronic Mail
- Getting email Up and Running
- Sendmail+IDA
- Netnews
- C News
- A Description of NNTP
- Newsreader Configuration
- A glossary
- Annotated Bibliography
