= Tim Lister =

American software engineer and author

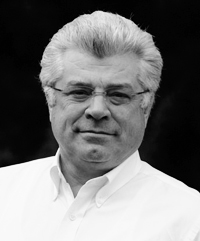
Tim Lister

Tim Lister (born 1949) is an American software engineer and author with specialty in design, software risk management, and human aspects of technological work. He is a Principal of The Atlantic Systems Guild Inc. and a fellow of the Cutter Consortium. He is (with co-authors) a two-time winner of the Jolt Award for best published software development book of the year.

== Peopleware ==
Lister's work with collaborator Tom DeMarco on non-technical factors affecting team and individual performance eventually resulted in their book, Peopleware: Productive Projects and Teams originally published in 1987. This work was the subject of a retrospective special session of IEEE International Conference on Software 2007 commemorating 20th anniversary of its publication. Peopleware's prescriptions had mixed reception, with environmental factors like relative quiet and interrupt protection generally accepted, but other suggestions, particularly the use of enclosed space around a team in preference to open plan seating, largely ignored. The authors' Coding War Games study which supplies evidence for the book's conclusions about the effects of workplace factors on performance is still being cited in articles about workplace design more than 25 years after its initial publication. The term "Peopleware" is in general use among software practitioners to describe the extent to which an organization does or not conform to the book's proposed ideals.

== Patterns of organizational behavior ==
Lister is one of the originators of work that characterizes organizational culture using an approach first advocated (for architecture) by Christopher Alexander et al. In this scheme, organizations are classified by the extent to which they fit or do not fit one or more of 86 common patterns. The 86 proposed patterns serve as an organizational "pattern language" much as Alexander's 250 patterns make up an architectural pattern language.

== Published works ==
Lister is author or co-author of the following works:

- Peopleware: Productive Projects and Teams with co-author Tom DeMarco, Addison-Wesley Professional; 3 edition (July 1, 2013)
- Adrenaline Junkies and Template Zombies: Understanding Patterns of Project Behavior with co-authors Tom DeMarco, Peter Hruschka, Steve McMenamin, James Robertson, and Suzanne Robertson, Dorset House (March 3, 2008). Winner pof the 2009 Jolt Award.
- Waltzing With Bears: Managing Risk on Software Projects with co-author, Tom DeMarco, Dorset House (March 2003). Winner of the 2004 Jolt Award.
- "Estimating in Actual Time," Proceedings, Agile Development Conference, July, 2005.
- "Risk Management Is Project Management for Adults," IEEE Software, May, 1997.
- "Programmer Performance and the Effects of the Workplace," with co-author Tom DeMarco, Proceedings of the 8th International Conference on Software Engineering, IEEE Computer Society, 1985.
