= Critical Care (film) =

- Theatrical release poster
- Directed by: Sidney Lumet
- Screenplay by: Steven Schwartz
- Based on: Critical Care by Richard Dooling
- Produced by: Sidney Lumet; Steven Schwartz
- Starring: James Spader; Kyra Sedgwick; Helen Mirren; Margo Martindale; Jeffrey Wright; Wallace Shawn; Anne Bancroft; Albert Brooks; Philip Bosco; Colm Feore
- Cinematography: David Watkin
- Edited by: Tom Swartwout
- Production companies: ASQA Film Partnership; Live Entertainment; Mediaworks; Village Roadshow Pictures
- Distributed by: LIVE Entertainment (United States); Roadshow Entertainment (Australia)
- Release date: October 31, 1997
- Running time: 107 minutes
- Countries: United States; Australia
- Language: English
- Budget: $12 million
- Box office: $271,000

Critical Care is a 1997 American comedy film directed by Sidney Lumet. The film is a satire about American medicine. The screenplay by Steven Schwartz is based on the novel of the same name by Richard Dooling and stars James Spader, Kyra Sedgwick, Anne Bancroft, Helen Mirren, Jeffrey Wright, and Albert Brooks. Rick Baker provided special makeup effects. The film is about a doctor who finds himself involved in a fight with two half sisters over the care of their ailing father.

== Cast ==
- James Spader ... Dr. Werner Ernst
- Kyra Sedgwick ... Felicia Potter
- Helen Mirren ... Stella
- Anne Bancroft ... Nun
- Albert Brooks ... Dr. Butz
- Jeffrey Wright ... Bed Two
- Margo Martindale ... Constance "Connie" Potter
- Wallace Shawn ... Furnaceman
- Philip Bosco ... Dr. Hofstader
- Colm Feore ... Wilson
- Edward Herrmann ... Robert Payne
- James Lally ... Poindexter
- Harvey Atkin ... Judge Fatale
- Al Waxman ... Lawyer Sheldon Hatchett
- Hamish McEwan ... Dr. Hansen
- Jackie Richardson ... Mrs. Steckler
- Barbara Eve Harris ... Nurse Lucille
- Conrad Coates ... Dr. Miller
- Bruno Dressler ... Mr. Potter
- Caroline Nielsen ... Nurse Luscious

== Reception ==
On the review aggregator website Rotten Tomatoes, 59% of 17 critics' reviews are positive.

Writer Steven Schwartz was nominated for an Independent Spirit Award for best screenplay.
