= Sadi Moma =

Bulgarian folk song

The Free Software Foundation group singing Sadi Moma, followed by the Free Software Song

Sadi Moma ("A Girl Plants") is a Bulgarian folk song. The song, like many Bulgarian and other traditional Eastern European folk songs, is in an uneven meter: 7/8, counted as slow-quick-quick (SQQ).

There is a Bulgarian folk dance traditionally associated with the song Sadi Moma and often called by the same name. It is danced in one or more open circles of dancers, whose arms are joined in W-position.

Its melody was borrowed by Richard Stallman for the tune of the Free Software Song.

Translation in English:

A girl planted a vine, a white wine grape vine.
For one day she planted, for two she regretted
the white wine grape vine.
The vine grew up, the white wine grape vine.
It filled nine barrels with wine,
The tenth with clear, strong rakija.
A young soldier learned to drink.
He drank for two days, he drank for three days, for a week.
He drank up his black horse from under him.
