= Ivo D. Dinov =

Bulgarian–American academic scholar

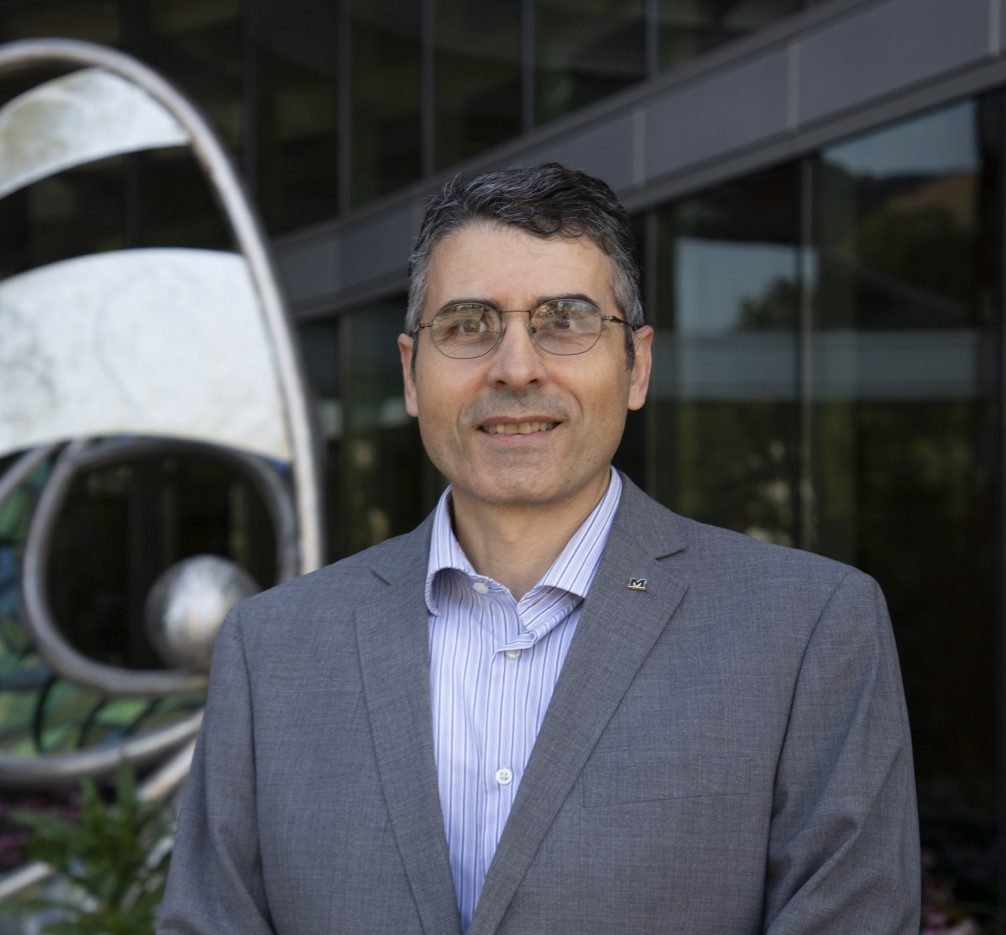
- Dinov in 2022
- Born: Ivaylo D. Dinov; 1968 (age 57–58); Sofia, Bulgaria
- Education: Florida State University (PhD, MS); Michigan Technological University (MS); Sofia University (BS)
- Scientific career
- Fields: statistics, mathematics, neuroscience, artificial intelligence
- Institutions: University of Michigan; University of California, Los Angeles
- Thesis: Mathematical and statistical techniques for modeling and analysis of medical data (1998)
- Doctoral advisor: De Witt Sumners, Fred William Huffer

Ivaylo (Ivo) D. Dinov (Bulgarian: Ивайло Д. Динов) is a mathematical statistician, data scientist, and computational neuroscientist, who is the Henry Philip Tappan collegiate professor at the University of Michigan. He is a co-developer of the 5D spacekime model, a new technique for complex time (kime) representation, modeling, and analysis of repeated measurement longitudinal processes. Dinov is the author of the Data Science and Predictive Analytics (DSPA) book and has published significantly on a wide range of topics, including mathematical modeling, computational statistics, data science, neuroscience, applied statistics, and generative artificial intelligence models (GAIMs).

== Education ==
In 1991, Dinov completed his undergraduate study in mathematics and informatics from Sofia University in Bulgaria. Under the supervision of Kenneth L. Kuttler, he wrote a master's thesis entitled "Bochner Integrals and vector measures" and received his MS in pure mathematics in 1993 from Michigan Technological University Advised by De Witt Sumners and Fred William Huffer, Dinov completed his MS in statistics and PhD in mathematics degrees at the Florida State University. His doctoral dissertation was on "Mathematical and statistical techniques for modeling and analysis of medical data".

Subsequently, Dinov was a postdoctoral fellow at the University of California, Los Angeles (UCLA). During his postdoctoral training at UCLA he received a T32 fellowship in neuroimaging and brain mapping, as part of the UCLA Institutional National Research Service Award.

== Academic career ==
Between 2001 and 2013, Dinov was a faculty in the departments of statistics and neurology at UCLA. In 2002, he founded the Statistics Online Computational Resource (SOCR).

In 2013, Dinov joined the faculty at the University of Michigan, where he has been serving in multiple academic leadership roles, including department chair, associate director of the Michigan Institute for Data Science, and chair of various University of Michigan faculty senate committees.

Dinov is an active member in several professional societies, including the American Statistical Association (ASA), International Association for Statistical Education (IASE), American Mathematical Society (AMS), American Physical Society (APS), and an honorary member (fellow) of the Sigma Theta Tau International Society and American Association for the Advancement of Science (AAAS). He is an elected member of the International Statistical Institute (ISI).

== Publications ==
Some of Dinov's selected publications include the following:

- Data Science and Predictive Analytics book, which has received multiple expert reviews and its editions in various digital, paperback, and hardcover formats have been read by over six million readers.
- The Data Science: Time Complexity, Inferential Uncertainty, and Spacekime Analytics book covers a wide range of topics including motivation for doing data science, characteristics of big datasets, artificial intelligence concepts and tools, neuroimaging genetics, climate change, problems with time, definition of Kime, economic forecasting, wave functions, definition and properties of operators, Fourier transforms, Kaluza-Klein theory, contravariance, velocity, Schrodinger equation, Lorenz transformation, Heisenberg's uncertainty principles, spacekime analytics, linear modelling using tensors, inferential uncertainty, and information theoretic versus data science formulations.
- The article Methodological challenges and analytic opportunities for modeling and interpreting big healthcare data identified multiple scientific gaps and proposed novel modeling methods for complex healthcare data including heterogeneous imaging, genetic, clinical and phenotypic data elements.

== Personal life ==
In 2022, as coach of the University of Michigan Men's Water Polo, Dinov led the Michigan Wolverines to a Big Ten Division title and was recognized as the "2022 Big Ten Division Men's Water Polo Coach of the Year".
