= Peopleware =

Role of people in software development

Peopleware can refer to anything that has to do with the role of people in the development or use of computer software and hardware systems, including such issues as developer productivity, teamwork, group dynamics, the psychology of programming, project management, organizational factors, human interface design and human–machine interaction.

== Overview ==
The concept of peopleware in the software community covers a variety of aspects:

- Development of productive persons
- Organizational culture
- Organizational learning
- Development of productive teams, and
- Modeling of human competencies.

== History ==
The neologism, first used by Peter G. Neumann in 1977 and independently coined by Meilir Page-Jones in 1980, was popularized in the 1987 book Peopleware: Productive Projects and Teams by Tom DeMarco and Timothy Lister.

The term Peopleware also became the title and subject matter of a long-running series of columns by Larry Constantine in Software Development magazine, later compiled in book form.
