= Programming the Z80 =

1979 book by Rodnay Zaks

- Author: Rodnay Zaks
- Language: English
- Subject: Computer programming
- Publisher: Sybex
- Publication date: 1979, 1980, 1982
- Publication place: United States
- Pages: 624
- ISBN: 0-89588-047-4

Programming the Z80 is a seminal computer programming text, written by Rodnay Zaks and first published in 1979 by Sybex. It is designed as both an educational text to teach programming techniques of elementary to intermediate level using assembly language, and as a self-contained reference book. It covers more general concepts, such as information representation and data structures, and describes in detail topics specific to the Zilog Z80 microprocessor, such as its internal hardware organisation and instruction set. The book is considered an indispensable reference guide by many Z80 programmers. It was also published by RadioShack with the title How To Program The Z80. In 1983, Sybex published a companion volume, Z80 Applications written by James W. Coffron.

The third revised edition was published in 1982.

== Contents ==
=== Book Overview ===
1. Preface
2. Basic Concepts
3. Z80 Hardware Organization
4. Basic Programming Techniques
5. The Z80 Instruction Set
6. Addressing Techniques
7. Input/Output Techniques
8. Input/Output Devices
9. Application Examples
10. Data Structures
11. Program Development
12. Conclusion

=== Appendices ===
- A. Hexadecimal Conversion Table
- B. ASCII Conversion Table
- C. Relative Branch Tables
- D. Decimal to BCD Conversion
- E. Z80 Instruction Codes
- F. Z80 to 8080 Equivalence
- G. 8080 to Z80 Equivalence
