= Richard Dooling =

American novelist and screenwriter

- Born: Richard Patrick Dooling; 1954 (age 71–72); Omaha, Nebraska, U.S.
- Education: Saint Louis University; Saint Louis University School of Law
- Occupations: Novelist; screenwriter; attorney
- Children: 4
- Writing career
- Pen name: Eleanor Druse
- Period: 1992–present
- Genres: Literary fiction, legal thriller, satire, horror
- Website: dooling.com

Richard Patrick Dooling (born 1954) is an American novelist and screenwriter. He is best known for his novel White Man's Grave, a finalist for the 1994 National Book Award for Fiction, and for co-producing and co-writing the 2004 ABC miniseries Stephen King's Kingdom Hospital.

Dooling's first novel, Critical Care (1992), was made into a 1997 movie of the same title, directed by Sidney Lumet and starring James Spader and Kyra Sedgwick. His next three novels—White Man's Grave (1994), Brain Storm (1998), and Bet Your Life (2002)—were all New York Times Notable Books. In conjunction with Kingdom Hospital, he also wrote The Journals of Eleanor Druse (2004), writing as Eleanor Druse, a character in the miniseries. Dooling's short story "Bush Pigs" was read as part of Selected Shorts, a program produced by Symphony Space in New York and aired on NPR. The performance was later included on the CD Getting There from Here, a compilation of listeners' favorites from the program.

His nonfiction book Blue Streak: Swearing, Free Speech, and Sexual Harassment (1996) is an examination of the social and legal implications of profane speech. In Rapture for the Geeks: When AI Outsmarts IQ (2008) he explores the implications of machine intelligence overtaking human intelligence. He has also written op-ed pieces for The New York Times, The Wall Street Journal, and The National Law Journal.

Dooling was born in Omaha, Nebraska, and is a graduate of Saint Louis University (1976) and Saint Louis University School of Law (1987). He has been a practicing attorney and developer of web-based legal tools for the St. Louis firm Bryan Cave. For several years, Dooling was a professor and lecturer at the University of Nebraska College of Law.

== Works ==
- Novels and stories
  - Critical Care (1992)
  - White Man's Grave (1994)
  - Brain Storm (1998)
  - Bet Your Life (2002)
  - The Journals of Eleanor Druse (writing as Eleanor Druse) (2004)
  - Send the Dead: A Novella and Four Stories (2025)
- Nonfiction
  - Blue Streak: Swearing, Free Speech, and Sexual Harassment (1996)
  - Rapture for the Geeks: When AI Outsmarts IQ (2008)
- As contributor or editor
  - Rendezvous in Black by Cornell Woolrich. Modern Library 20th Century Rediscoveries, 2004 [1948]. (Introduction)
  - Who Can Save Us Now?: Brand-New Superheroes and Their Amazing (Short) Stories (2008) (Roe #5)
