= After the Software Wars =

Book by Keith Curtis

- Author: Keith Curtis
- Language: English
- Genre: Computer science
- Publisher: Lulu
- Publication date: February 20, 2009
- Publication place: United States
- Media type: Print (paperback); PDF (download)
- Pages: 300
- ISBN: 978-0-578-01189-9
- OCLC: 318814794

After the Software Wars is a book by Keith Curtis about free software and its importance in the computing industry, specifically about its impact on Microsoft and the proprietary software development model.

The book is about the power of mass collaboration and possibilities of reaching up to a singular rationale showing successful collaborative examples in open source such as Linux and Wikipedia.

Keith Curtis attended the University of Michigan, but dropped out to work as a programmer for Microsoft after meeting Bill Gates in 1993. He worked there for 11 years, and then left after he found he was bored.

He then wrote and self-published After the Software Wars to explain the caliber of free and open source software and why he believes Linux is technically superior to any proprietary operating system.

== See also ==
- Lad (video game), an iOS puzzle game by Keith Curtis
