= American Graphics Institute =

American publisher

American Graphics Institute, Inc.
- Company type: Private
- Founded: 1994; 31 years ago
- Founders: Christopher Smith; Jennifer Smith
- Headquarters: Woburn, Massachusetts, United States
- Parent: Aquent (2007–2009)
- Website: agitraining.com

American Graphics Institute, Inc. (AGI) is a company headquartered in the Boston suburb of Woburn, Massachusetts that provides publishing, consulting and technical training. The institute also writes and publishes books about business strategy and design technology.

== History ==
American Graphics Institute was founded in 1994 by Christopher Smith and Jennifer Smith. AGI initially provided instruction on the use of early desktop publishing software from companies such as Adobe Systems and Quark, Inc. but later began teaching web publishing and interactive design classes. In 2007, the company was acquired by creative staffing firm Aquent and renamed Aquent Graphics Institute. In July 2009, the founders reacquired AGI and it was again renamed American Graphics Institute.

== Educational content ==
AGI's founders and instructors are the creators of various books, e-books, and video tutorials. The books cover 16 different topics including web design, HTML, Adobe, Photoshop, and Microsoft Office, some of which were created for the For Dummies book series.

In 2013, AGI partnered with publisher John Wiley & Sons to launch Digital Classroom, a digital subscription service that gave subscribers access to 2,500 video tutorials and 50 e-books many created by AGI. The Digital Classroom subscription service is no longer available but its e-books are still in publication some used internationally in universities and colleges for classes that teach design and publishing.

== Development training ==
AGI's development training services include certificate programs, classes at training centers and through online courses, and private training for groups and organizations. AGI has training centers in Boston, Chicago, London, New York City, Orlando, and Philadelphia.

== CRE8 conference ==
AGI hosted the annual CRE8 Conference in Florida which provided professional development education for marketing and design professionals. Conference speakers included Marissa Mayer, Al Gore, and Michael Eisner.
