= Higher-Order Perl =

2005 book

- The cover of Higher-Order Perl
- Author: Mark Jason Dominus
- Cover artist: Yvo Riezebos
- Language: English, Chinese
- Subject: Computer programming, Perl
- Published: 2005 Morgan Kaufmann
- Publication place: USA
- Media type: Print, MOD, PDF
- Pages: 600
- ISBN: 1-55860-701-3
- OCLC: 56086063
- Dewey Decimal: 005.13/3 22
- LC Class: QA76.73.P22 D56 2005

Higher-Order Perl: Transforming Programs with Programs (ISBN 1-55860-701-3) is a book about the Perl programming language written by Mark Jason Dominus with the goal to teach Perl programmers with a strong C and Unix background how to use techniques with roots in functional programming languages like Lisp that are available in Perl as well.

In June 2013, a Chinese-language edition was published by China Machine Press. The full text of Higher Order Perl is available online in a variation of the Plain Old Documentation format (MOD) and in PDF.

== Reception ==
The book has received reviews from sources including ACM Computing Reviews, Linux Journal, Weblabor, Dr. Dobb's Journal, and The Prague Bulletin of Mathematical Linguistics.
