= Core Python Programming =

Textbook written by Wesley J. Chun

- Cover of Core Python Programming Second Edition
- Author: Wesley J. Chun
- Genre: Computer
- Publisher: Prentice Hall
- Publication date: 2006 (2nd Ed.)
- Media type: Book
- Pages: 1136
- ISBN: 0-13-226993-7
- OCLC: 70149251

Core Python Programming is a textbook on the Python programming language, written by Wesley J. Chun. The first edition of the book was released on December 14, 2000. The second edition was released several years later on September 18, 2006. Core Python Programming is mainly targeted at higher education students and IT professionals.

With each printing, the book is updated and errors are corrected. The official site has updates and errata for those with the older printings as well as changes since the last printing. As of February 2011, this edition was in its fifth printing.

The book has been translated into French, Chinese (simplified) and Hindi.

== Content ==
Core Python Programming is divided into two parts with a total of 23 chapters, as well as an index.

=== Part I ===
The first part of Core Python Programming, Core Python, deals with the basic aspects of the Python programming language. Chapters One and Two, named What is Python? and Getting Started respectively, give instructions on how to install and configure Python, as well as detailing the basic operators and simple statements. Part One continues to cover Sequences (Lists, Strings and Tuples), Built-in Functions and creating functions, Loops (for-loop, while loop and if-statement being the most common); Modules, a full explanation on what Object Oriented Programming is; and syntax.

=== Part II ===
Part Two, Advanced Topics, contains information about the more complex aspects of Python, such as GUI programming. Other topics covered include regular expressions, network programming, multithreaded programming, web programming and database programming.
