= De Witt Sumners =

American mathematician

De Witt Lee Sumners is an American mathematician, having been the Robert O. Lawton Distinguished Professor at Florida State University. He is known for his research in knot theory, topological fluid dynamics, and their application to DNA.

== Biography ==
Sumners earned his Ph.D. in 1967 from the University of Cambridge under the supervision of John F. P. Hudson. He retired in 2007, and became a professor emeritus. In 2012, he was named as one of the inaugural Fellows of the American Mathematical Society.
