= Geoffrey James (journalist) =

American journalist (born 1953)

Geoffrey James (born August 26, 1953) is an American author, journalist, and contributing editor on Inc.com. His CNN blog "Sales Source" was ranked on Business.com's list of the "Top 10 Blogs on Sales Management for 2016."

== Biography ==
Born in 1953, James received a B.A. in English Language and Literature from University of California, Irvine in 1975. He has worked as a software architect, marketing executive, and freelance writer. He has taught courses at Boston University, University of California, Los Angeles, University of California, Santa Cruz, and University of Washington.

== Works ==
- James, Geoffrey (1984). Document Databases. Van Nostrand Reinhold. ISBN 9780442281854.
- ——— (1987). The Tao of Programming. InfoBooks. ISBN 978-0931137075.
- ——— (1988). The Zen of Programming. InfoBooks. ISBN 978-0931137099.
- ——— (1989). Computer Parables: Enlightenment in the Information Age. InfoBooks. ISBN 978-0931137136.
- ——— (1996). Business Wisdom of the Electronic Elite: 34 Winning Management Strategies from CEOs at Microsoft, COMPAQ, Sun, Hewlett-Packard, and Other Top Companies. Random House. ISBN 978-0812963793.
- ——— (1997). Giant Killers: 34 Cutting Edge Management Strategies from the World's Leading High-Tech Companies. Random House. ISBN 978-0752810300.
- ——— (1998). Success Secrets from Silicon Valley. Random House. ISBN 978-0812929768.
- ——— (2013). How to Say It: Business to Business Selling: Power Words and Strategies from the World's Top Sales Experts. Penguin. ISBN 978-0735204584.
- ——— (2014). Business Without the Bullsh*t: 49 Secrets and Shortcuts You Need to Know. Hachette. ISBN 978-1455574582.
