= Hacker Culture =

Book by Douglas Thomas

- Author: Douglas Thomas
- Language: English
- Genre: Cultural criticism
- Publisher: University of Minnesota Press
- Publication date: 1 March 2002
- Publication place: United States
- Media type: Print (hardcover and paperback)
- Pages: 266 p
- ISBN: 0-8166-3345-2 (first edition, hardcover)
- OCLC: 47922733

Hacker Culture is a cultural criticism book written by Douglas Thomas that deals with hacker ethics and hackers.

== Reception ==
Publishers Weekly reviewed Hacker Culture as "an intelligent and approachable book on one of the most widely discussed and least understood subcultures in recent decades."

San Francisco Chronicle reviewed Hacker Culture as "an unusually balanced history of the computer underground and its sensational representation in movies and newspapers."
