= Zak Greant =

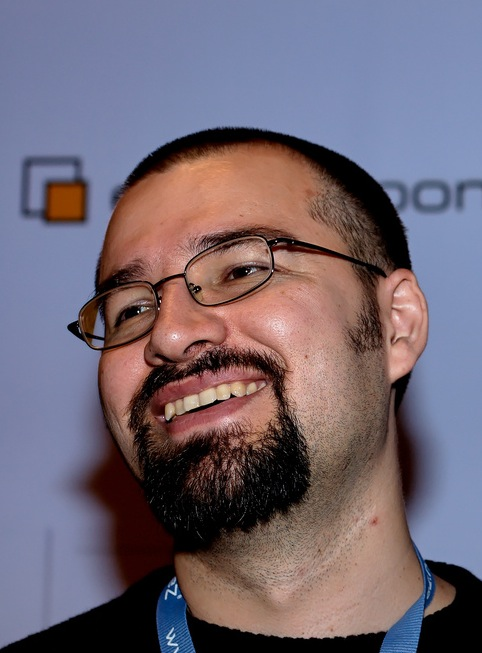
- Greant at ZendCon 2006
- Occupations: Evangelist, strategist, author, speaker
- Employer: ActiveState Software Inc.

== Life & work ==
Zak Greant has been an active participant, teacher, and mentor in free software and open source communities, including PHP, MySQL, Mozilla, the Free Software Foundation and the Open Source Initiative.

He has previously worked for MySQL AB, Sxip Identity, eZ Systems and the Mozilla. While having been the primary author on two books, on MySQL and PHP respectively, he contributed to others.

== Books ==
- 2006 MySQL Phrasebook - ISBN 0-672-32839-9
- 2003 PHP Functions Essential Reference - ISBN 0-7357-0970-X
