= Saifedean Ammous =

Lebanese economist and author

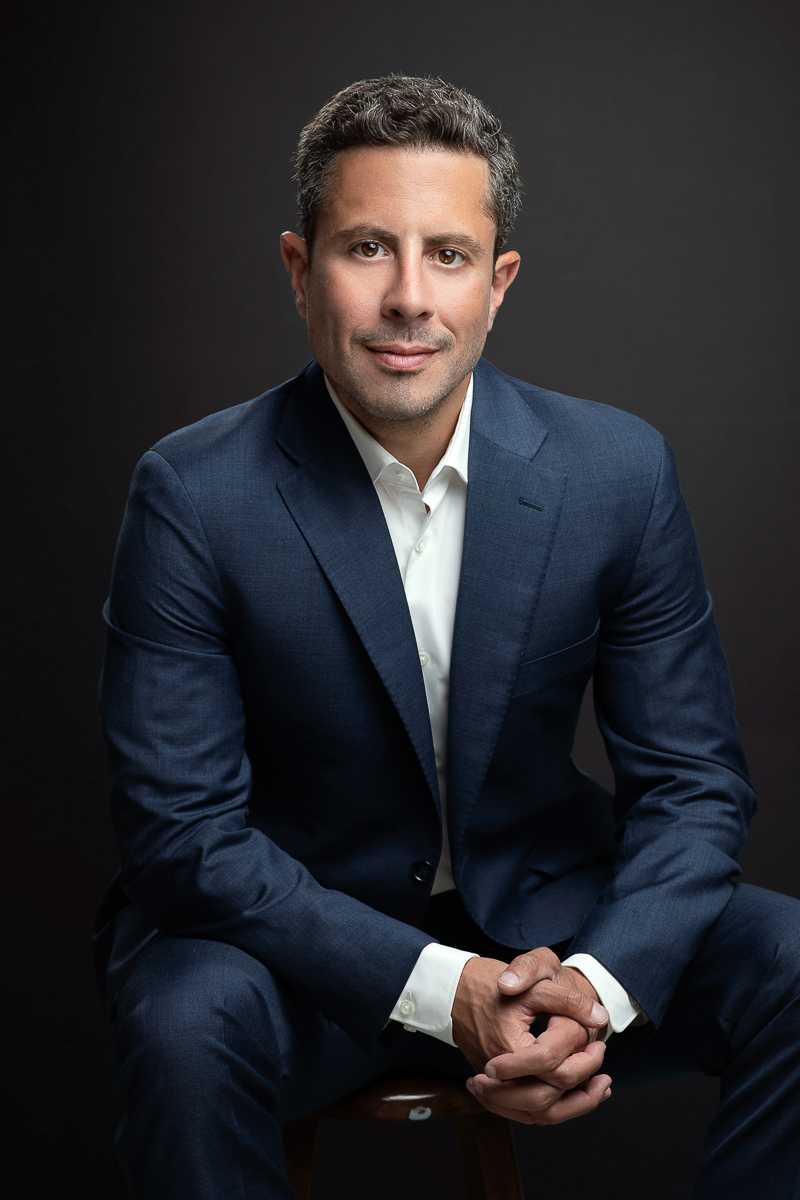
- Born: October 24, 1980 (age 46); Nablus, Palestine
- Occupations: Economist, author
- Known for: The Bitcoin Standard

Academic background
- Education: American University of Beirut, London School of Economics and Political Science, Columbia University

Academic work
- School or tradition: Austrian economics

Saifedean Ammous (born October 24, 1980) is a Palestinian economist, author, and prominent advocate of Bitcoin. Ammous is best known for his book The Bitcoin Standard (2018), which explains the economics of Bitcoin grounded in the principles of Austrian economics and critiques modern fiat currencies and contemporary economics. He has gained a significant following among Bitcoin enthusiasts, libertarians, and those skeptical of mainstream economic systems.

== Early life and education ==
Ammous was born in Nablus, Palestine, and spent his early years in Saudi Arabia and Brazil before moving to Ramallah in the West Bank in 1990. He completed high school at the Ramallah Friends School in 1998. Ammous then attended the American University of Beirut, earning a bachelor's degree in Mechanical Engineering, followed by a master’s in Development Management (Applied Development Economics specialisation) from the London School of Economics. He later obtained a PhD in Sustainable Development, with focus on Development Economics and Policy from School of International and Public Affairs, Columbia University. During his PhD studies, Ammous served as Head Teaching Assistant for Professor Jeffrey Sachs’s Sustainable Development course, and was also a member of the Biofuels Working Group, led by Nobel Laureate in Economics, Professor Joseph Stiglitz.

== Academic career ==
Ammous began his academic career as an assistant professor of economics at the Lebanese American University in Beirut. His research initially focused on development economics, resource economics, and energy. Over time, he became increasingly critical of fiat money systems and conventional economic policies, leading him to advocate for Austrian economics and Bitcoin.

== The Bitcoin Standard ==
Ammous published The Bitcoin Standard in 2018, which has since become one of the most widely read books on Bitcoin and Austrian economics, translated into 38 languages. The book explains Bitcoin’s development, attributes, and limitations, placing it within the broader context of monetary history. Ammous argues that Bitcoin, with its limited supply and permissionless nature, represents the most advanced form of money and a viable alternative to inflation-prone fiat currencies.

The book has attracted endorsements from high-profile individuals, such as Michael Saylor, former CEO of MicroStrategy, who has credited it as a major influence on his company’s decision to adopt a Bitcoin standard. Saylor has publicly recommended The Bitcoin Standard as essential reading for those interested in monetary theory and the potential of Bitcoin.

In 2024, U.S. Representative Thomas Massie stated that listening to The Bitcoin Standard influenced his decision to reintroduce the Federal Reserve Board Abolition Act, legislation aimed at dismantling the central bank.

The book also drew critique from a scholar specializing in Austrian economics. In a review for the Quarterly Journal of Austrian Economics, monetary theorist Kristoffer Mousten Hansen contested Ammous’s emphasis on the stock-to-flow ratio, calling it a "red herring," and contended that the essential distinction in sound money lies in whether the production of the money commodity is driven by entrepreneurs seeking profits or by fiat whim.

== Later works and influence ==
Following the success of The Bitcoin Standard, Ammous released The Fiat Standard in 2021, which examines the economic, social, and political consequences of fiat currency. In it, he expands on his critiques of fiat money, which he sees as a root cause of economic instability and increased government power.

In 2022, Ammous published Principles of Economics, designed to teach the foundations of economic theory from an Austrian perspective, further establishing his stance against traditional Keynesian economics. He was appointed as an economic advisor to the government of El Salvador, the first country to adopt Bitcoin as legal tender, advising President Nayib Bukele and the Bitcoin Office on Bitcoin's integration into the country’s financial system.

Ammous frequently speaks at international conferences, appears on podcasts, and teaches courses on economics, Bitcoin, and Austrian economics. He has been a vocal critic of central banking and Keynesian economics, which he argues are unsustainable and lead to detrimental economic cycles.

== Palestine ==
Ammous has published on the subject of Palestine. He wrote an obituary of Mahmoud Darwish in 2008. In 2023 he debated Walter Block on the subject of Israel and liberty. In 2025, he delivered a lecture to the Property and Freedom Society titled "Property Rights: The Root of the Palestinian-Israeli Conflict".

== Bibliography ==
- The Bitcoin Standard: The Decentralized Alternative to Central Banking (2018)
- The Fiat Standard: The Debt Slavery Alternative to Human Civilization (2021)
- Principles of Economics (2022)
