= The Oracle J2EE Companion =

The Oracle J2EE Companion is a book by Narendra M Thumbhekodige, Jai Krishna, Padmanabhan Manavazhi, Rajesh Sundararaghavan, Ravi Shankar, Reghu Krishna Pillai, V Srinivasan, Umesh Kulkarni and Vikas Mathur. The book is about Oracle Java EE technology stack and deals with different steps of learning concepts and technologies in Internet programming. It leverages the Oracle Technology Network (OTN) extensively to showcase Java EE technology.

The book was published by Tata McGraw-Hill in 2004 and was written as a textbook for the e-Pulse course conducted by Oracle India Pvt Ltd at R V Engineering college in Bangalore. The book is available in English and Chinese language.
