= Randi J. Rost =

Randi J. Rost (born February 24, 1960) is a computer graphics professional and contributor to graphics standards. He wrote the 1981 Apple II game King Cribbage and published numerous instructional and review articles in trade publications.

He currently manages relationships with a game developers and other graphics ISVs at Intel. He was a founding member of the Khronos Group and has represented Intel on the Khronos Group Board of Promoters. He came up with the name Khronos (a transliteration for the Greek word "time") during this group's formative period, and for this was awarded a pound of smoked salmon. In 1993, Randi won the National Computer Graphics Association (NCGA) Award for the Advancement of Graphics Standards, given to recognize the individual who has shown dedication to the development and use of computer graphics standards.

Prior to joining Intel, he was a driver engineering manager and then director of developer relations at 3Dlabs. Randi was a core contributor to the development of the OpenGL Shading Language and the OpenGL API that supports it, as well as one of the first programmers to design and implement shaders using this technology. He led the 3Dlabs team devoted to educating developers and helping them take advantage of new graphics hardware technology.

In the late 1980s, he was a co-architect of PEX, a 3D graphics extension to the X Window System. He was a founding member of the Picture-Level Benchmark organization that was later merged into SPEC and has become the leading creator of vendor-neutral graphics benchmarking tools.

== Published work ==
OpenGL Shading Language, Third Edition, Randi J. Rost, Bill Licea-Kane, Addison-Wesley Professional, July 30, 2009. ISBN 0-321-63763-1

OpenGL Shading Language, Second Edition, Randi J. Rost, Addison-Wesley Professional, January 25, 2006. ISBN 0-321-33489-2 OpenGL Shading Language, Randi J. Rost, Addison-Wesley Professional, February 12, 2004. ISBN 0-321-19789-5

X and MOTIF Quick Reference Guide, Second Edition, Randi J. Rost, Digital Press, October 1993. ISBN 1-55558-118-8

X and MOTIF Quick Reference Guide, Randi J. Rost, Digital Press, September 13, 1990. ISBN 1-55558-052-1
