= Rapture for the Geeks =

Book by Richard Dooling

Rapture for the Geeks: When AI Outsmarts IQ
- Author: Richard Dooling
- Language: English
- Publisher: Crown
- Publication date: September 30, 2008
- Publication place: United States
- Media type: Print (Hardback)
- Pages: 272
- ISBN: 978-0307405258

Rapture for the Geeks: When AI Outsmarts IQ (2009) is a non-fiction book by American Law Professor Richard Dooling. The book provides an alarming window into a hypothetical future technological singularity, where machine intelligence outstrips human intelligence. The book also provides a historical review of man's relationship with machines, including dangers caused by other technologies such as nuclear weaponry.

== See also ==
- Technological singularity
