= Rodnay Zaks =

American computer programmer and author (born 1946)

Rodnay Zaks PhD
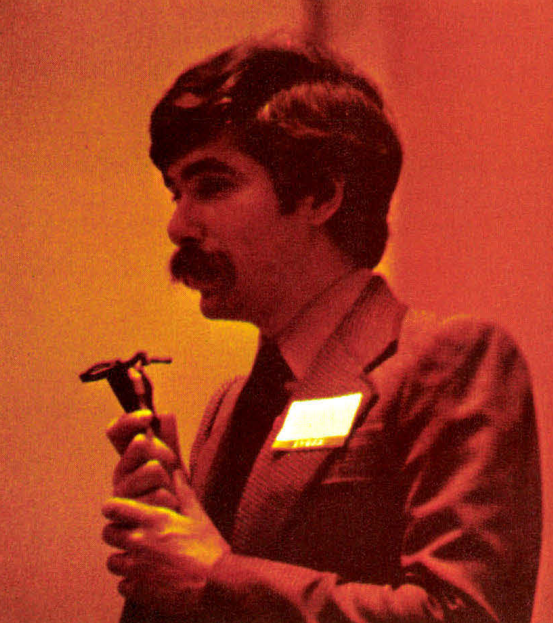
- Rodnay Zaks, 1978
- Born: 10 February 1946 (age 80); Paris, France
- Education: École Centrale Paris; University of California, Berkeley
- Occupations: Book author, editor
- Writing career
- Language: English
- Years active: 1970–present
- Genre: non-fiction
- Subjects: Computers, APL, microprocessors
- Notable works: Programming the Z80; Programming the 6502

Rodnay Zaks (born 10 February 1946, Paris) is a French-born American author of many books on computer programming, including the seminal Programming the Z80 and Programming the 6502. He is the founder of independent computer book publisher Sybex and was its president and chief executive officer (CEO) until its takeover by John Wiley & Sons in May 2005.

Zaks has an engineering degree from the École Centrale Paris and a master's degree from the University of California, Berkeley, where he also was the third person to receive a Doctor of Philosophy (PhD) from the then new computer science department. He began a career in training engineers and managers in the then new microprocessor technology, and subsequently founded Sybex in 1976.

Zaks has been a director of Association for Computing Machinery's (ACM) Special Interest Group on Microarchitecture (SIGMICRO), and founded the non-profit organization EUROMICRO.

An early publication of Zaks' from Sybex was A microprogrammed APL implementation which includes the complete source code listing for the microcode for a Digital Scientific Corporation Meta 4 microprogrammable processor implementing the programming language APL.

== Selected publications ==
- Zaks, Rodnay (September 1971). Microprogrammed APL. Fifth IEEE Computer Conference Proceedings. p. 193.
- Zaks, Rodnay (June 1972). A Microprogrammed APL Implementation (PhD). University of California, Berkeley.
- Zaks, Rodnay; Steingart, David; Moore, Jeffrey (18–20 May 1971). "A firmware APL time-sharing system". AFIPS '71 (Spring): Proceedings of the 18–20 May 1971, spring joint computer conference. Spring joint computer conference (SJCC). Vol. 38. AFIPS Press. pp. 179–190. doi:10.1145/1478786.1478812. ISBN 978-1-4503-7907-6.
- Zaks, Rodnay (12–14 October 1976). Euromicro Symposium on Microprocessing and Microprogramming (2nd, papers). Second Euromicro Symposium on Microprocessing and Microprogramming. Venice, Italy.
- Nicoud, Jean-Daniel; Wilmink, Jan; Zaks, Rodnay, eds. (3–6 October 1977). Microcomputer Architectures: Third Euromicro Symposium on Microprocessing and Microprogramming. Euromicro Symposium on Microprocessing and Microprogramming. Amsterdam, Netherlands: Elsevier Science.
- Hartenstein, Reiner; Zaks, Rodnay, eds. (23–25 June 1975). Workshop on the Microarchitecture of Computer Systems. Workshop on the Microarchitecture of Computer Systems. Nice, France.
