= You Look Like a Thing and I Love You =

2019 book by Janelle Shane

You Look Like a Thing and I Love You: How Artificial Intelligence Works and Why It's Making the World a Weirder Place
- Author: Janelle Shane
- Language: English
- Genre: Popular science
- Publisher: Voracious
- Publication date: 5 November 2019
- Publication place: United States
- Pages: 272 pp
- ISBN: 978-0316525244

You Look Like a Thing and I Love You: How Artificial Intelligence Works and Why It's Making the World a Weirder Place is a 2019 nonfiction book by optics research scientist Janelle Shane. The book documents experiences the author and others have had with machine learning programs, and discusses what "intelligence" means in the context of "artificial intelligence" (AI).

== Overview ==
The main title of the book refers to a phrase generated as a pickup line by a neural net that Shane trained on pickup lines gathered from the Internet.

Shane discusses the dangers of "artificial stupidity" (not phrased as such), describing for example a 2016 crash at a city street intersection, which Shane attributes in part to Tesla Autopilot being trained for highway use and therefore failing to properly perceive a blocking flatbed truck from a side view. Shane provides "Five Principles of AI Weirdness", including "AIs don't understand the problems you want them to solve" and "AIs take the path of least resistance to their programmed goal". Shane gives many examples of AI "shortcuts", including the (possibly apocryphal) legend of an AI that appeared to reliably recognize tanks from photos, by noticing whether the photos were taken on a sunny or a cloudy day. Another of Shane's examples is a hypothetical scenario where a simulated AI evolved to keep people from entering a hazardous hallway during a fire emergency, learns the optimal strategy is to just kill everyone so they cannot enter the hallway. Because AI lacks general intelligence, Shane is skeptical of efforts to power self-driving cars or to detect online hate speech using artificial intelligence. Shane also pushes back against concerns artificial intelligence will replace people's jobs.

== Reception ==
A reviewer in the Christian Science Monitor found the book "eye-opening" and "fun", as well as "comforting" in terms of Shane's arguments against jobs being at risk from AI. A review in ZDNet called the book "approachable" and "insightful". A capsule review in The Philadelphia Inquirer called Shane a "great guide", and a capsule review in Publishers Weekly called the book an "accessible primer" with "charming" and "often-hilarious" content. A reviewer in E&T judged the book "stands out for Shane's madcap sense of humour and affection for the subject". In The Verge, a December 2019 list of "the 11 best new sci-fi books" included Shane's book, stating "Science fact, rather than science fiction, (the book is) incredibly informative". A similar list in Ars Technica praised that "anybody, not just the engineer-minded or the tech-savvy, can understand the often abstract concepts she details." The book also made Scientific American's list of "Recommended Books" for November 2019.

== See also ==
- Commonsense reasoning
