= Bill Wagner (software) =

American computer programmer

Bill Wagner is an American software developer and author, known for his involvement in the C# programming language.

== Early life ==
Wagner received a B.S. in computer science from the University of Illinois at Urbana–Champaign. He was a self-employed consultant for eight years before joining with Dianne Marsh to cofound SRT Solutions, an Ann Arbor, Michigan-based software development company, in 1999. Wagner won an Automation Alley Emerging Technology Leader award in 2011.

== Career and contributions ==
Wagner is known primarily for .Net development work, particularly C#. He is the author of several books, including Effective C# (now in its second edition, 2010) and More Effective C# (2004). Wagner has written a number of articles appearing in MSDN Magazine, the C# Developer Center, Visual C++ Developer's Journal, Visual Studio Magazine, ASP.NET Pro Magazine, .NET Developer's Journal, as well as technical articles for software developers. Wagner wrote a set of programming idioms for C#.

Wagner has stated that he has been involved with C# since public betas for C# 1.0 were released. Prior to that time, Wagner had worked with C++ and Java.

Wagner was appointed Microsoft regional director for Michigan in 2003, and he was reappointed and named a Microsoft MVP in 2006. He has since received 11 Microsoft MVP awards. Wagner also won the Automation Alley Emerging Technology Leader award in 2011.

Wagner is a founding member and past president of the Great Lakes .NET User Group and the Ann Arbor .NET Developers Group, and a contributor to the Ann Arbor Computer Society.
