= Thinking in Java =

1998 book by Bruce Eckel

- Author: Bruce Eckel
- Language: English
- Subject: Java
- Genre: Computing
- Publisher: Prentice Hall, Pearson
- Publication date: 1998
- Publication place: United States
- ISBN: 978-0131872486

Thinking in Java (ISBN 978-0131872486) is a book about the Java programming language, written by Bruce Eckel and first published in 1998. Prentice Hall published the 4th edition of the work in 2006. The book represents a print version of Eckel’s "Hands-on Java" seminar.

Bruce Eckel wrote On Java 8 as a sequel for Thinking in Java and it is available in Google Play as an ebook.

== Publishing history ==
The first edition of Thinking in Java was published on January 1, 1998 by Prentice Hall, with the second edition being published on January 1, 2000, the third being published on January 1, 2003, and the fourth and final edition being published by Pearson on February 10, 2006.

Eckel has made various versions of the book publicly available online.

== Reception ==
Thinking in Java has received multiple awards, including the Java Developer's Journal Editor's Choice Award for Best Book in 1998, the Jolt Productivity Award in 1999, and the JavaWorld Reader's Choice Award for Best Book in 2000 and 2001.

- TechRepublic wrote:

"The particularly cool thing about Thinking in Java is that even though a large amount of information is covered at a rapid pace, it is somehow all easily absorbed and understood. This is a testament to both Eckel’s obvious mastery of the subject and his skilled writing style."

- Linux Weekly News praised the book in its review.
- CodeSpot wrote:

"Thinking in Java is a must-read book, especially if you want to do programming in Java programing language or learn Object-Oriented Programming (OOP)."

== Awards ==
Thinking in Java has won multiple awards from professional journals:

- 1998 Java Developers Journal Editors Choice Award for Best Book
- Jolt Productivity Award, 1999
- 2000 JavaWorld Readers Choice Award for Best Book
- 2001 JavaWorld Editors Choice Award for Best Book
- 2003 Software Development Magazine Jolt Award for Best Book
- 2003 Java Developers Journal Readers Choice Award for Best Book
- 2007 Java Developer’s Journal Readers’ Choice Best Book
