= The Bitcoin Standard =

2018 book by Saifedean Ammous

- Author: Saifedean Ammous
- Publisher: Wiley
- Publication date: 2018
- ISBN: 978-1119473862
- Website: saifedean.com/tbs

The Bitcoin Standard: The Decentralized Alternative to Central Banking is a 2018 book by Saifedean Ammous, published by Wiley.

A review in Reason magazine praised Ammous' explanations, but criticised periodic rants "attributing all of society's alleged cultural failings... to government-issued money", a criticism repeated in a review in Cato Journal.

A 2021 review by the Central Bank of Barbados criticised Ammous' summary of the gold standard era, and the lack of empirical evidence for his claims.

== See also ==
- Bitcoin
