= Brian P. Flannery =

American physicist

Brian P. Flannery is a physicist who variously worked as an astrophysicist and as a climate modeller for ExxonMobil. He is known for being a co-author of Numerical Recipes, a widely used series of textbooks describing useful algorithms.

Flannery obtained his undergraduate degree in astrophysics from Princeton University in 1970 and his doctorate from the University of California, Santa Cruz in 1974, under the supervision of John Faulkner. As an astrophysicist, he published work on cataclysmic variable stars and other interacting binaries until 1982.

In 1980, he joined ExxonMobil as a climate modeler and subsequently became a manager in 1998. He previously participated in Working Group III of the Intergovernmental Panel on Climate Change and continues to contribute to research on the mitigation of climate change. He has at times been accused of participating in effort's by ExxonMobil to undermine action against climate change. Jeremy Leggett recounts a conversation with Flannery in his book, The Carbon War, in which the physicist claimed that if most of the recoverable oil and gas on the planet were to be burnt there would be no noticeable effect on the climate.
