= Operating System Concepts =

Operating systems textbook

- Cover of the "Dinosour book" (1982 edition)
- Author: Abraham Silberschatz and James Peterson
- Language: English
- Subject: Computer science
- Publisher: Addison-Wesley
- Publication date: 1982
- Publication place: United States
- Media type: Print
- ISBN: 978-0-201-06097-3

Operating System Concepts by Abraham Silberschatz and James Peterson is a classic textbook on operating systems. It is often called the "dinosaur book", as the first edition of the book had on the cover a number of dinosaurs labeled with various old operating systems. The bigger dinosaurs were labeled with the older big OSs. The ape-like creature was labeled UNIX. The idea was that like dinosaurs, operating systems evolve.

== Publication history ==
The first edition of Operating System Concepts was released in 1982 and was published by Addison-Wesley, as was every edition of the textbook since release.

The book has been published in updated editions since 1983. The third edition added the author Peter Galvin, and the sixth edition added the author Greg Gagne. As of 18 June 2025 the textbook was in its tenth edition.
