= Free Software Song =

Single by Richard M. Stallman
- Released: 1993
- Genre: Filk, folk
- Songwriter: Richard M. Stallman

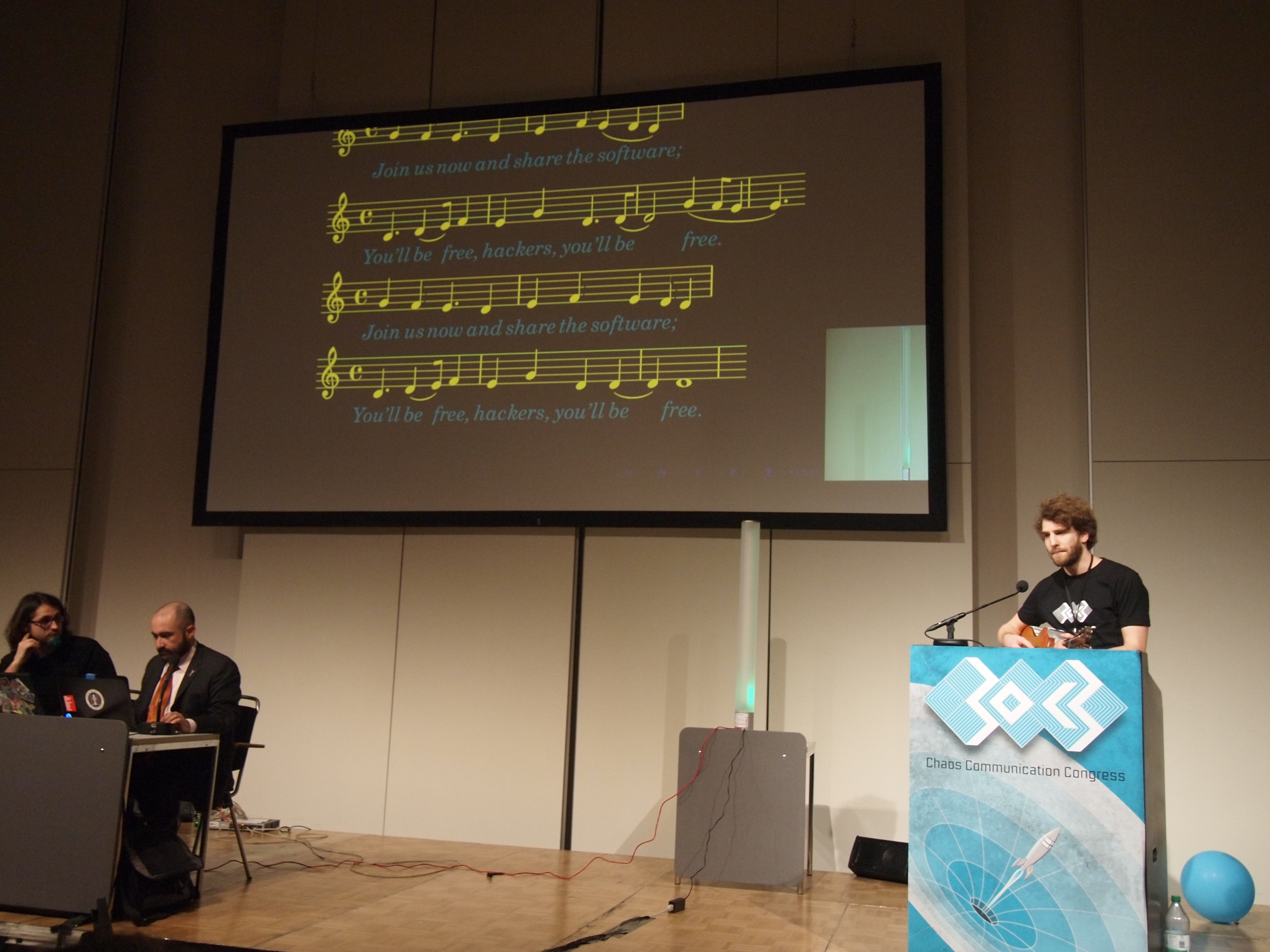
MQuintus performing the Free Software Song along with the audience at German hackerconference 30C3

The Free Software Song is a filk song by Richard M. Stallman about free software. The song is set to the melody of the Bulgarian "Sadi Moma".

A version of this song is also performed by a band (the GNU/Stallmans) during the credits of the documentary Revolution OS. In 1998, Matt Loper recorded a techno version of the song. Jono Bacon also recorded a heavy metal version of the song, and the band Fenster recorded a rhythmic version. In addition, there is a Spanish pop punk version recorded by ALEC, and a Rick Astley mashup, "Never Gonna Give GNU Up".

A version is used in the free software karaoke video game Sinatra.

== Lyrics ==
"The Free Software Song"
An interpretation in proper Bulgarian style, both vocal and musical by several artists

Join us now and share the software;
You'll be free, hackers, you'll be free.
Join us now and share the software;
You'll be free, hackers, you'll be free.

Hoarders can get piles of money,
That is true, hackers, that is true.
But they cannot help their neighbors;
That's not good, hackers, that's not good.

When we have enough free software
At our call, hackers, at our call,
We'll throw out those dirty licenses
Ever more, hackers, ever more.

Join us now and share the software;
You'll be free, hackers, you'll be free.
Join us now and share the software;
You'll be free, hackers, you'll be free.

The lyrics have been placed in the public domain.
