= Douglas Thomas (academic) =

American scholar (born 1966)

- Born: 1966 (age 59–60)
- Occupation: Professor

Academic background
- Education: University of Minnesota

Academic work
- Discipline: Communication studies
- Sub-discipline: Critical theory, cultural studies
- Institutions: USC Annenberg School for Communication and Journalism
- Notable works: Hacker Culture
- Notable ideas: Gamer disposition

Douglas Thomas (born 1966) is an American scholar, researcher, and journalist. He is associate professor at the Annenberg School for Communication at the University of Southern California where he studies technology, communication, and culture. He is author and editor of books including Reading Nietzsche Rhetorically (Guilford Press, 1998), Cybercrime: Security and Surveillance in the Information Age (with Brian Loader, Routledge, 2000), Hacker Culture (University of Minnesota Press, 2002), and Technological Visions: The Hopes and Fears that Shape New Technologies (with Marita Sturken and Sandra Ball-Rokeach). He has published numerous articles in academic journals and is the founding editor of Games and Culture: A Journal of Interactive Media. Games and Culture, which he founded in 2006, is the first academic journal dedicated to the study of video game culture. The following year, he organized a major video game studies conference in Tokyo that helped establish game studies as an academic field.

In 1998 and 1999, he covered the case of Kevin Mitnick for Wired News. On July 24, 2002, he testified before United States Congress on the topic of cyberterrorism and critical infrastructure protection.

His research has been funded by the Annenberg Center on Communication Leadership & Policy, the Richard Lounsbery Foundation, and the MacArthur Foundation, and focuses on the relationship between virtual worlds, civic engagement, digital media, and learning.

His 2008 article co-authored with John Seely Brown, "The Gamer Disposition", was named a Harvard Business Review Breakthrough Idea of 2008, and also featured it on its Conversation Starter blog.

Thomas also co-authored A New Culture of Learning: Cultivating the Imagination for a World of Constant Change with Brown, which was translated into Turkish.

Thomas has consulted with the governments of South Korea, the United Arab Emirates, and Singapore on education reform, and has advised curricula for a number of United States school systems. His research project Bodies of Code examines the relationship between technology and the human body from World War II to the present.
