= Data Science and Predictive Analytics =

Book on data science applications

Data Science and Predictive Analytics: Biomedical and Health Applications using R
- Author: Ivo D. Dinov
- Language: English
- Series: The Springer Series in Applied Machine Learning
- Subject: Computer science, data science, artificial intelligence
- Publisher: Springer
- Publication date: 2018 (1st ed.), 2023 (2nd edition)
- Publication place: Switzerland
- Media type: Print (hardcover and softcover), electronic (PDF and EPub)
- ISBN: 978-3-031-17483-4 978-3-319-72346-4, 978-3-031-17485-8, 978-3-031-17482-7

The first edition of the textbook Data Science and Predictive Analytics: Biomedical and Health Applications using R, authored by Ivo D. Dinov, was published in August 2018 by Springer. The second edition of the book was printed in 2023.

This textbook covers some of the core mathematical foundations, computational techniques, and artificial intelligence approaches used in data science research and applications.

By using the statistical computing platform R and a broad range of biomedical case-studies, the 23 chapters of the book first edition provide explicit examples of importing, exporting, processing, modeling, visualizing, and interpreting large, multivariate, incomplete, heterogeneous, longitudinal, and incomplete datasets (big data).

== Structure ==
=== First edition table of contents ===
The first edition of the Data Science and Predictive Analytics (DSPA) textbook is divided into the following 23 chapters, each progressively building on the previous content.

1. Motivation
2. Foundations of R
3. Managing Data in R
4. Data Visualization
5. Linear Algebra & Matrix Computing
6. Dimensionality Reduction
7. Lazy Learning: Classification Using Nearest Neighbors
8. Probabilistic Learning: Classification Using Naive Bayes
9. Decision Tree Divide and Conquer Classification
10. Forecasting Numeric Data Using Regression Models
11. Black Box Machine-Learning Methods: Neural Networks and Support Vector Machines
12. Apriori Association Rules Learning
13. k-Means Clustering
14. Model Performance Assessment
15. Improving Model Performance
16. Specialized Machine Learning Topics
17. Variable/Feature Selection
18. Regularized Linear Modeling and Controlled Variable Selection
19. Big Longitudinal Data Analysis
20. Natural Language Processing/Text Mining
21. Prediction and Internal Statistical Cross Validation
22. Function Optimization
23. Deep Learning, Neural Networks

=== Second edition table of contents ===
The significantly reorganized revised edition of the book (2023) expands and modernizes the presented mathematical principles, computational methods, data science techniques, model-based machine learning and model-free artificial intelligence algorithms. The 14 chapters of the new edition start with an introduction and progressively build foundational skills to naturally reach biomedical applications of deep learning.

1. Introduction
2. Basic Visualization and Exploratory Data Analytics
3. Linear Algebra, Matrix Computing, and Regression Modeling
4. Linear and Nonlinear Dimensionality Reduction
5. Supervised Classification
6. Black Box Machine Learning Methods
7. Qualitative Learning Methods—Text Mining, Natural Language Processing, and Apriori Association Rules Learning
8. Unsupervised Clustering
9. Model Performance Assessment, Validation, and Improvement
10. Specialized Machine Learning Topics
11. Variable Importance and Feature Selection
12. Big Longitudinal Data Analysis
13. Function Optimization
14. Deep Learning, Neural Networks

== Reception ==
The materials in the Data Science and Predictive Analytics (DSPA) textbook have been peer-reviewed in the Journal of the American Statistical Association, International Statistical Institute’s ISI Review Journal, and the Journal of the American Library Association. Many scholarly publications reference the DSPA textbook.

As of January 17, 2021, the electronic version of the book first edition (ISBN 978-3-319-72347-1) is freely available on SpringerLink and has been downloaded over 6 million times. The textbook is globally available in print (hardcover and softcover) and electronic formats (PDF and EPub) in many college and university libraries and has been used for data science, computational statistics, and analytics classes at various institutions.
