= The Tao of Programming =

- Author: Geoffrey James
- Illustrator: Gloria Garland
- Cover artist: Gloria Garland
- Language: English
- Subject: Computer programming
- Genre: Computer programming, Satire
- Publisher: InfoBooks
- Publication date: 1987
- Publication place: United States
- Media type: Print (Paperback)
- Pages: 151
- ISBN: 0-931137-07-1
- OCLC: 13904639
- Dewey Decimal: 005 19
- LC Class: QA76.6 .J354 1987
- Followed by: The Zen of Programming

The Tao of Programming is a book written in 1987 by Geoffrey James. Written in a tongue-in-cheek style spoof of classic Taoist texts such as the Tao Te Ching and Zhuangzi which belies its serious message, it consists of a series of short anecdotes divided into nine "books":

- The Silent Void
- The Ancient Masters
- Design
- Coding
- Maintenance
- Management
- Corporate Wisdom
- Hardware and Software
- Epilogue

Geoffrey James wrote two other books on this theme, The Zen of Programming (978–0931137099) in 1988 and Computer Parables: Enlightenment in the Information Age (978–0931137136) in 1989.

== See also ==
- Hacker koan
