= Dirk Eddelbuettel =

Canadian statistician, data scientist and researcher

- Citizenship: Canada, USA
- Education: Karlsruhe Institute of Technology (MSc); School for Advanced Studies in the Social Sciences (MA, PhD)
- Occupations: Data scientist, software engineer
- Employer: University of Illinois Urbana-Champaign
- Known for: R programming, Debian developer, Rocker Project
- Title: Adjunct Clinical Professor of Statistics
- Website: dirk.eddelbuettel.com

Dirk Eddelbuettel is a Canadian-American statistician, data scientist and researcher. He is one of the authors of the open-source software package Rcpp, written in the R programming language, and has also written the textbook Seamless R and C++ Integration with Rcpp on the topic. He is co-founder of the R In Finance Conference. In addition, he has contributed to many packages in R as well as the Debian project. He is also a co-creator of the Rocker Project bringing Docker to R.

== Early life and education ==
Eddelbuettel has an M.Sc in Industrial Engineering (Comp.Sci./OR) from Karlsruhe Institute of Technology in Germany. He received an M.A. and a PhD in Financial Econometrics from the School for Advanced Studies in the Social Sciences (EHESS) in France.

== Career ==
Eddelbuettel has been a contributor to CRAN for over a decade. He is the co-author/maintainer of more than sixty packages. He is also the Debian/Ubuntu maintainer for R and other quantitative software, editor of the CRAN Task Views for Finance and High-Performance Computing, co-founder of the annual R/Finance conference, and an editor of the Journal of Statistical Software. He is a member of the R Foundation and contributed to R-Hub.

Eddelbuettel has been interviewed by Data Science Los Angeles and others. He frequently gives talks to the R community.

He worked as a senior quantitative analyst from 2008 to 2012, and as a senior financial engineer from 2012 to 2018. Currently he is working as a principal software engineer in Chicago.

Eddelbuettel joined University of Illinois at Urbana-Champaign in 2018. He works as an adjunct Clinical Professor in Statistics where he created and teaches STAT 447: Data Science Programming Methods.
