= Bruce Eckel =

American computer programmer, author and consultant

Bruce Eckel (born July 8, 1957 (age 69)) is a computer programmer, author, and consultant.

Eckel's best known works are Thinking in Java and the two-volume series Thinking in C++, aimed at programmers wanting to learn the Java or C++ programming languages, respectively, particularly those with little experience of object-oriented programming.

Eckel was a founding member of the ANSI/ISO C++ standard committee.

== Views on computing ==
In 2011, Eckel extolled the virtues of the Go programming language as a natural successor to C++:

"The complexity of C++ (even more complexity has been added in the new C++), and the resulting impact on productivity, is no longer justified. All the hoops that the C++ programmer had to jump through in order to use a C-compatible language make no sense anymore — they're just a waste of time and effort. Now, Go makes much more sense for the class of problems that C++ was originally intended to solve."

— Bruce Eckel (2011)

== See also ==
- ISO/IEC 14882 - C++ standard

== Bibliography ==
- Computer Interfacing with Pascal & C, Bruce Eckel. Eisys 1988, ISBN 0-89716-211-0.
- Using C++, Bruce Eckel. Osborne/McGraw-Hill 1989, ISBN 978-0-07-881522-5.
- C++ Inside & Out, Bruce Eckel. Osborne/McGraw-Hill 1993, ISBN 978-0-07-881809-7.
- Blackbelt C++: The Masters Collection, Edited by Bruce Eckel. M&T/Holt 1994, ISBN 978-1-55851-334-1.
- Thinking in C++: Introduction to Standard C++, Volume One (2nd Edition), Bruce Eckel. Prentice-Hall PTR 2000, ISBN 978-0-13-979809-2. Available for free download
- Thinking in C++, Vol. 2: Practical Programming, 2nd Edition, Bruce Eckel and Chuck Allison. Prentice-Hall PTR, 2003. ISBN 0-13-035313-2. Available for free download
- Thinking in Java, 4th Edition, Bruce Eckel. Prentice-Hall PTR, 2006. ISBN 0-13-187248-6.
- "First Steps in Flex", Bruce Eckel and James Ward. MindView, Inc., 2008. ISBN 978-0-9818725-0-6.
- "Atomic Scala", Bruce Eckel and Dianne Marsh. Mindview, LLC, 2013. ISBN 978-0-9818725-1-3.
- "On Java 8", Bruce Eckel, MindView LLC, 2017. ISBN 978-0-9818725-2-0.
- "Atomic Kotlin", Bruce Eckel & Svetlana Isakova, MindView LLC, 2021. ISBN 978-0-9818725-4-4.
