= Peopleware: Productive Projects and Teams =

Book on project management for software development

- Author: Tom DeMarco, Tim Lister
- Language: English
- Genre: Non-fiction
- Publication date: 1987

Peopleware: Productive Projects and Teams is a 1987 book on the social side of software development, specifically managing project teams. It was written by software consultants Tom DeMarco and Tim Lister, from their experience in the world of software development. This book was revised in 1999 and 2013.

== Overview ==
Peopleware is a popular book about software organization management, what the authors describe as peopleware. The first chapter of the book claims, "The major problems of our work are not so much technological as sociological in nature". The book approaches sociological or 'political' problems such as group chemistry and team jelling, "flow time" and quiet in the work environment, and the high cost of turnover. Other topics include the conflicts between individual work perspective and corporate ideology, corporate entropy, "teamicide" and workspace theory.

The authors presented most subjects as principles backed up by some concrete story or other information. As an example, the chapter "Spaghetti Dinner" presents a fictional example of a manager inviting a new team over for dinner, then having them buy and prepare the meal as a group, in order to produce a first team success. Other chapters use real-life stories or cite various studies to illustrate the principles being presented.

== Editions ==
- 1st Edition: 1987
- 2nd Edition: 1999
- 3rd Edition: 2013

The second edition kept the original content with only a few changes or corrections. The bulk of the new content was eight chapters in a new section at the end. The new section's chapters revisited some of the concepts of the original chapters with changes and added new ones. The eBook PDF version published by DorsetHouse was not searchable as each page appeared to be an image. The Kindle version is searchable. The new content of the third edition is spread out through the book. There are six new chapters, but the original content has also been updated.

== Reception ==
BYTE in 1989 said "Peopleware is the Mythical Man-Month for the 1990s". Summarizing the book's advice as "Get the best people (cut out the deadwood), and make them happy. Turn them loose", the magazine concluded that it "deserves a place on any technical manager's bookshelf".
