= Network information system =

General system for managing networks

A network information system (NIS) is an information system for managing networks, such as electricity network, water supply network, gas supply network, telecommunications network., or street light network

NIS may manage all data relevant to the network, e.g.- all components and their attributes, the connectivity between them and other information, relating to the operation, design and construction of such networks.

NIS for electricity may manage any, some or all voltage levels- Extra High, High, Medium and low voltage. It may support only the distribution network or also the transmission network.

Telecom NIS typically consists of the physical network inventory and logical network inventory. Physical network inventory is used to manage outside plant components, such as cables, splices, ducts, trenches, nodes and inside plant components such as active and passive devices. The most differentiating factor of telecom NIS from traditional GIS is the capability of recording thread level connectivity. The logical network inventory is used to manage the logical connections and circuits utilizing the logical connections. Traditionally, the logical network inventory has been a separate product but in most modern systems the functionality is built in the GIS serving both the functionality of the physical network and logical network.

Water network information system typically manages the water network components, such as ducts, branches, valves, hydrants, reservoirs and pumping stations. Some systems such as include the water consumers as well as water meters and their readings in the NIS. Sewage and stormwater components are typically included in the NIS. By adding sensors as well as analysis and calculations based on the measured values the concept of Smart water system is included in the NIS. By adding actuators into the network the concept of SCADA can be included in the NIS.

NIS may be built on top of a GIS (Geographical information system).

Private Cloud based NIS is gaining in functionality and popularity. As much of the changes to the network are conducted on the field, this approach has significant benefits compared to traditional GIS. The as-builts can be documented on site using mobile connectivity to the NIS. Many of the products in this category, such as by Keypro offer easy to use web interface which requires no installations at the client workstation.
