= Artificial Unintelligence: How Computers Misunderstand the World =

2018 non-fiction book

Artificial Unintelligence
- Author: Meredith Broussard
- Language: English
- Genre: Non-fiction
- Published: 2018
- Publisher: MIT Press
- Publication place: USA
- ISBN: 9780262537018

Artificial Unintelligence: How Computers Misunderstand the World is a 2018 American book, a guide to understanding the inner workings and outer limits of technology and why we should never assume that computers always get it right. It won the 2019 Prose Award in the Computing and Information Sciences category, and has been widely reviewed.

== Overview ==
Meredith Broussard is a data journalism professor at the Arthur L. Carter Journalism Institute at New York University. Her research focuses on the role of artificial intelligence in journalism. Broussard has published features and essays in many outlets including The Atlantic, Harper’s Magazine, and Slate Magazine.

Broussard has published a wide range of books examining the intersection of technology and social practice. Her book Artificial Unintelligence: How Computers Misunderstand the World, published in April 2018 by MIT Press, examines the limits of technology in solving social problems. A review in Times Higher Education states that

Illustrated with examples from Broussard's own work and experience, this is an intensely personal journey that gives a real sense of travelling with a friend. Her descriptions of hackathons and other aspects of start-up culture are honest and atmospheric, capturing the social as well as the technical aspects of the marketplace in a way that anchors moments of technical innovation in their time and place. Hopefully, this book will gather a wide general, as well as academic, audience. It deserves to become a classic – but, even more, it deserves to be read and debated.

== Reception ==
Artificial Unintelligence: How Computers Misunderstand the World won the 2019 Prose Award in the Computing and Information Sciences category.

Positive reviews appeared in The Philadelphia Inquirer, American Scientist, ZDNet, and in the Royal Society of Chemistry's publication, Chemistry World. Dr. Broussard has given talks based on her book at the international meeting of the History of Science Society and, on a lecture series inspired by her work, as the keynote speaker for "AI: The Future is Now" at Central Washington University.
