= John Smiley (author) =

American computing author and teacher (born 2001)

John Smiley is an American computing author and teacher known for basic programming classes and books.

He is also president of John Smiley & Associates. Smiley has authored books on Visual Basic, C#, C++ and Java. His first book was published in 1998 by Wrox Publishing (ActivePath). He wrote 3 more books for Wrox before Wrox declared bankruptcy in 2001. In 2002, parts of his book series were picked up by Osborne/McGraw Hill Publishing, Apress Publishing, and Muska and Lipmann (now Course Technologies.) In 2004, when the market for Introductory programming books fizzled, he negotiated and obtained the rights to the books and began self-publishing them through Lulu Press in 2006. Since then, he has self-published his new books under the Smiley Publishing imprint. Many of his books have been translated into major foreign languages.

In addition to his 'Learning to Program' type books, he has written a book on the worldwide Stair Climbing phenomenon.

He teaches classes online, first through e-learning ventures such as ElementK or the now defunct Ziff Davis University (ZDU), and currently through his own Moodle Rooms site. Notably, he has taught over 100,000 students via online courses.

He has been a professor at Penn State University, the Philadelphia College of Textiles and Science, and Holy Family College.

== Works ==
- Learn to Program With Visual Basic 6 (ISBN 1902-745-000, Wrox Publishing, 1998)
- Learn to Program With Visual Basic 6 (ISBN 1590-591-518, Reprinted by Apress Publishing, 2003)
- Learn to Program With Visual Basic 6 Examples (ISBN 1902-745-06X, Wrox Publishing, 1999)
- Learn to Program With Visual Basic 6 Examples (ISBN 1929-685-157, Reprinted by Course Technology, 2001)
- Learn to Program Databases with Visual Basic 6 Databases (ISBN 1902-745-035, Wrox Publishing, 1999)
- Learn to Program Databases with Visual Basic 6 Databases (ISBN 1929-685-173, Reprinted by Course Technology, 2001)
- Learn to Program With Visual Basic 6 Objects (ISBN 1902-745-043, Wrox Publishing, 1999)
- Learn to Program With Visual Basic 6 Objects (ISBN 1929-685-165, Reprinted by Course Technology, 2001)
- Learn to Program with Java (ISBN 0072-131-896, Osborne/McGraw Hill Publishing, 2001)
- Learn to Program with Java (Reprinted by Smiley Publishing, 2006)
- Learn to Program with Java Kindle Edition (ISBN 978-0-9827349-7-1, Smiley Publishing, 2010)
- Learn to Program with Java Nook Edition (ISBN 978-1-61274-004-1, Smiley Publishing, 2010)
- Learn to Program with Java SE6 (ISBN 978-1-61274-023-2, Smiley Publishing, 2006)
- Learn to Program with Java SE6 Kindle Edition (ISBN 978-1-61274-018-8, Smiley Publishing, 2010)
- Learn to Program with Java SE6 Nook Edition (ISBN 978-1-61274-019-5, Smiley Publishing, 2010)
- Learn to Program with VB.Net 2002/2003 (ISBN 0072-131-772, Osborne.McGraw Hill Publishing, 2002)
- Learn to Program with VB.Net 2002/2003 (Reprinted by Smiley Publishing, 2006)
- Learn to Program with C# (ISBN 0072-222-611, Osborne/McGraw Hill Publishing, 2002)
- Learn to program with C# (Reprinted by Smiley Publishing, 2006)
- Learn to program with C# Kindle Edition (ISBN 978-0-9827349-6-4, Smiley Publishing, 2010)
- Learn to program with C# Nook Edition (ISBN 978-1-61274-005-8, Smiley Publishing, 2010)
- Learn to Program with C++ (ISBN 0072-225-351, Osborne/McGraw Hill Publishing, 2002)
- Learn to Program with C++ (Reprinted by Smiley Publishing, 2006)
- Learn to Program with C++ Kindle Edition (ISBN 978-0-9827349-5-7, Smiley Publishing, 2010)
- Learn to Program with C++ Nook Edition (ISBN 978-1-61274-007-2, Smiley Publishing, 2010)
- Learn to Program with Borland's C++ Batch Compiler (ISBN 978-1-61274-015-7, Smiley Publishing, 2006)
- Learn to Program with Borland's C++ Batch Compiler Kindle Edition (ISBN 978-1-61274-020-1, Smiley Publishing, 2010)
- Learn to Program with Borland's C++ Batch Compiler' Nook Edition (ISBN 978-1-61274-021-8, Smiley Publishing, 2010)
- Learn to Program with JavaScript (Smiley Publishing, 2006)
- Learn to Program with JavaScript Kindle Edition (ISBN 978-0-9827349-8-8, Smiley Publishing, 2010)
- Learn to Program with JavaScript Nook Edition (ISBN 978-1-61274-006-5, Smiley Publishing, 2010)
- Learn to Program with VB.Net 2005 Express (Smiley Publishing, 2007)
- Learn to Program with Visual C# 2005 Express (ISmiley Publishing, 2008)
- Learn to Program with Visual C# 2008 Express (ISBN 978-0-615-24842-4, Smiley Publishing, 2008)
- Learn to Program with Visual C# 2008 Express Kindle Edition (ISBN 978-0-9827349-3-3, Smiley Publishing, 2010)
- Learn to Program with Visual C# 2008 Express' Nook Edition (ISBN 978-1-61274-008-9, Smiley Publishing, 2010)
- Learn to Program with VB.Net 2008 Express (ISBN 978-0-615-24843-1, Smiley Publishing, 2008)
- Learn to Program with VB.Net 2008 Express Kindle Edition (ISBN 978-0-9827349-2-6, Smiley Publishing, 2010)
- Learn to Program with VB.Net 2008 Express Nook Edition (ISBN 978-1-61274-009-6, Smiley Publishing, 2010)
- Learn to Program with VB.Net 2010 Express (ISBN 978-0-9827349-0-2, Smiley Publishing, 2010)
- Learn to Program with VB.Net 2010 Express Kindle Edition (ISBN 978-0-9827349-4-0, Smiley Publishing, 2010)
- Learn to Program with VB.Net 2010 Express' Nook Edition (ISBN 978-1-61274-002-7, Smiley Publishing, 2010)
- Learn to Program with Visual C# 2010 Express (ISBN 978-0-9827349-1-9, Smiley Publishing, 2010)
- Learn to Program with Visual C# 2010 Express Kindle Edition (ISBN 978-0-9827349-9-5, Smiley Publishing, 2010)
- Learn to Program with Visual C# 2010 Express Nook Edition (ISBN 978-1-61274-003-4, Smiley Publishing, 2010)
- Computer Programming for Seniors Using Visual Basic 2010 Express (ISBN 978-1-61274-001-0, Smiley Publishing, 2010)
- Computer Programming for Seniors Using Visual Basic 2010 Express Kindle Edition (ISBN 978-1-61274-010-2, Smiley Publishing, 2010)
- Computer Programming for Seniors Using Visual Basic 2010 Express Nook Edition (ISBN 978-1-61274-014-0, Smiley Publishing, 2010)
- Computer Programming for Seniors Using Visual C# 2010 Express (ISBN 978-1-61274-024-9, Smiley Publishing, 2010)
- Computer Programming for Seniors Using Visual C# 2010 Express Kindle Edition (ISBN 978-1-61274-016-4, Smiley Publishing, 2010)
- Computer Programming for Seniors Using Visual C# 2010 Express Nook Edition (ISBN 978-1-61274-017-1, Smiley Publishing, 2010)
- The Complete Book of Stair Climbing 2012 Edition (ISBN 978-1-61274-027-0, Smiley Publishing, 2012)
- The Complete Book of Stair Climbing 2012 Edition Kindle Edition (ISBN 978-1-61274-028-7, Smiley Publishing, 2012)
- The Complete Book of Stair Climbing 2012 Edition Nook Edition (ISBN 978-1-61274-029-4, Smiley Publishing, 2012)
- My Climb To The Top (of the Bell Atlantic Tower) Kindle Edition (ISBN 978-1-61274-025-6, Smiley Publishing, 2012)
- My Climb To The Top (of the Bell Atlantic Tower) Nook Edition (ISBN 978-1-61274-026-3, Smiley Publishing, 2012)
