= Andrew Troelsen =

Andrew W. Troelsen is currently a technology manager at Thomson Reuters in the Enterprise Content Platform (ECP - Big Data) division. He is an author of several books in the Microsoft technology space including books on Microsoft (D)COM, ATL, .NET, C#, VB (4.0 - modern) and COM & .NET Interoperability. His latest edition of his C# book covers the .NET Core platform and each C# 7.0 update. He has over 18 years experience authoring software development (3-5 day) workshops for engineers on MS platform technologies.

== Books ==
- Developer's Workshop to Com and Atl 3.0 (Andrew Troelsen (2000))
- C# and the .NET Platform (Andrew Troelsen (2001))
- COM and .NET Interoperability (Andrew Troelsen (2002))
- Visual Basic .NET and the .NET Platform: An Advanced Guide (Andrew Troelsen (2002))
- C# and the .NET Platform, Second Edition (Andrew Troelsen (2003))
- Exploring .Net (Andrew Troelsen, Jason Bock (2003))
- Pro C# 2005 and the .NET 2.0 Platform, Third Edition (Andrew Troelsen (2005))
- Pro VB 2005 and the .NET 2.0 Platform, Second Edition (Andrew Troelsen (2006))
- Expert ASP.NET 2.0: Advanced Application Design (Dominic Selly, Andrew Troelsen, Tom Barnaby (2006))
- Pro C# 2008 and the .NET 3.5 Platform, Fourth Edition (Andrew Troelsen (2007))
- Pro C# with .NET 3.0, Special Edition (Andrew Troelsen (2007))
- Pro VB 2008 and the .NET 3.5 Platform (Andrew Troelsen (2008))
- Pro VB 2010 and the .NET 4 Platform (Andrew Troelsen, Vidya Vrat Agarwal (2010))
- Pro C# 2010 and the .NET 4 Platform, Fifth Edition (Andrew Troelsen (2010))
- Pro Expression Blend 4 (Andrew Troelsen (2011))
- Pro C# 5.0 and the .NET 4.5 Framework, Sixth Edition (Andrew Troelsen (2012))
- C# 6.0 and the .NET 4.6 Framework, Seventh Edition (Andrew Troelsen, Philip Japikse (2015))
- Pro C# 7: With .NET and .NET Core, Eighth Edition (Andrew Troelsen, Philip Japikse (2017))
- Pro C# 8 with .NET Core 3: Foundational Principles and Practices in Programming, Ninth Edition (Andrew Troelsen, Phil Japikse (2020))
- Pro C# 9 with .NET 5: Foundational Principles and Practices in Programming, Tenth Edition (Andrew Troelsen, Phillip Japikse (2021))
- Pro C# 10 with .NET 6: Foundational Principles and Practices in Programming, Eleventh Edition (Andrew Troelsen, Phil Japikse (2022))
