= Digital Journalism (journal) =

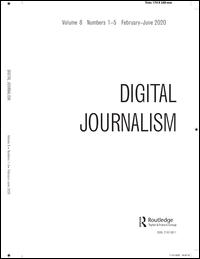
- Discipline: Journalism
- Language: English
- Edited by: Oscar Westlund

Publication details
- History: 2013–present
- Publisher: Routledge
- Frequency: 10/year
- Impact factor: 5.4 (2024)

Standard abbreviations
- ISO 4: Digit. Journal.

Indexing
- ISSN: 2167-0811 (print); 2167-082X (web)
- LCCN: 2012202684
- OCLC no.: 860014507

Links
- Journal homepage; Online access; Online archive

Digital Journalism is a peer-reviewed academic journal that covers the field of journalism. It was established in 2013 by Bob Franklin (Cardiff University). The editor-in-chief is Oscar Westlund (Oslo Metropolitan University). The journal is published by Routledge and is abstracted and indexed in Scopus and the Social Sciences Citation Index.

The journal is seen as part of a 'digital turn' in journalism studies in response to the crisis precipitated by the effects of the platform economy on journalism itself. Although journalism itself is seen to be in crisis, "the number of publications originating in journalism studies as a field of inquiry has surged, signifying enormous growth and prosperity within the field. The field’s rapid growth is also aided by the launch of several international periodicals with a focus on journalism, including a new journal dedicated to the developments in journalism and society precipitated by digital technologies, i.e., Digital Journalism", according to Fan, Ohme and Neuberger.
