= Matthew L. Jones =

American scientist and history professor (born 1972)

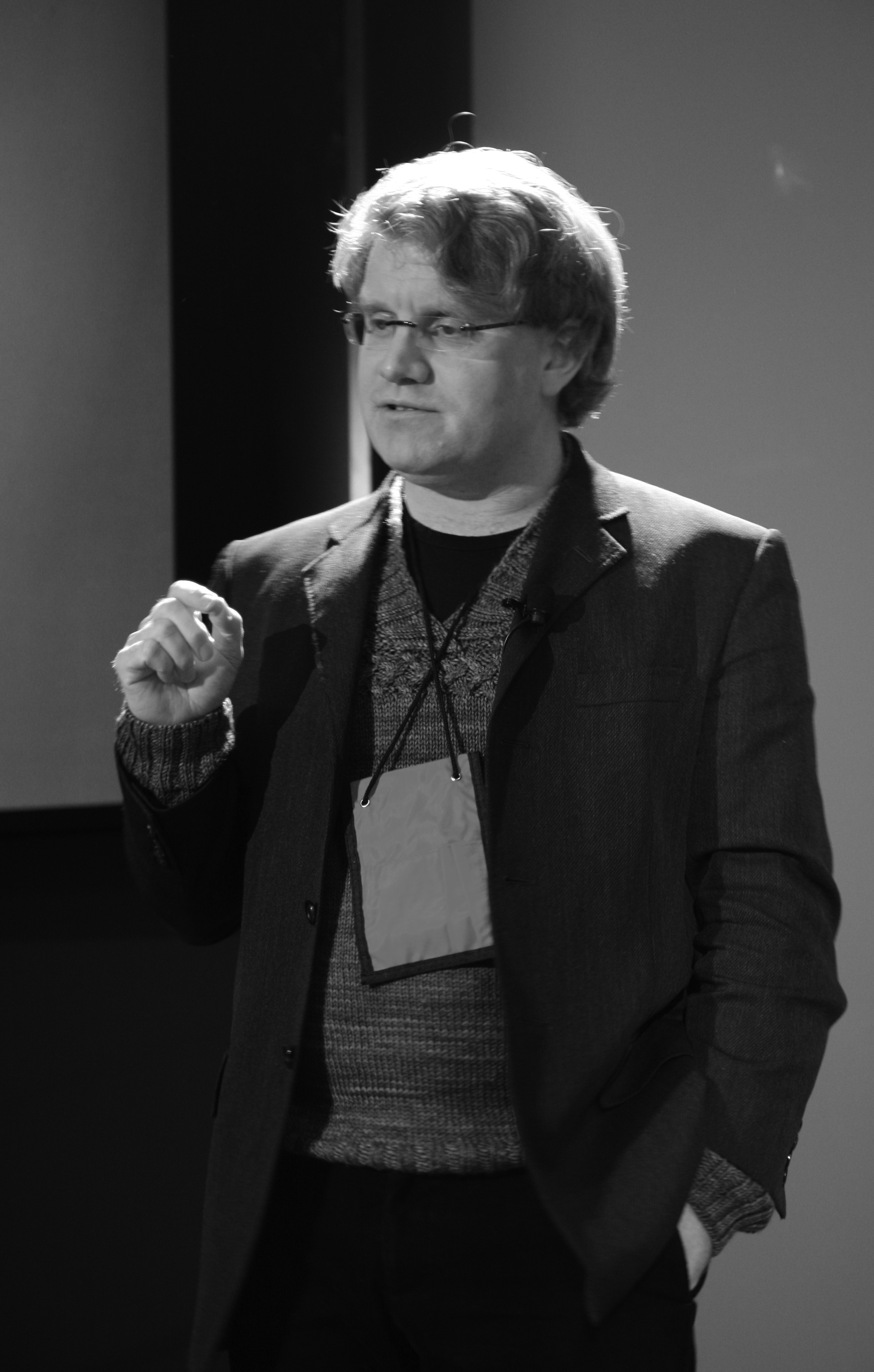
- Born: June 27, 1972
- Education: Doctor of Philosophy
- Alma mater: Harvard University; University of Cambridge; Harvard University
- Occupation: Historian of science and technology, university teacher, historian
- Employer: Columbia University; Princeton University (2023–)
- Awards: Guggenheim Fellowship (history of science and technology, history of economic thought, 2012)
- Website: www.nescioquid.org

Matthew Laurence Jones (born 1972) is a professor of the history of science and technology. He is an academic on history as well as data science and cybersecurity. From 2000 to 2023, Jones was employed as a professor by Columbia University; he joined Princeton as Smith Family Professor of History in 2023.

== Early life and education ==
Matthew Laurence Jones was born in 1972 and raised in Reno, Nevada. He attended Harvard University, graduating with a B.A. in 1994 and later attended the University of Cambridge, receiving an M.Phil. in 1995. He returned to Harvard for his Ph.D., which he received in 2000.

== Career and research ==
Jones joined the faculty of Columbia University in 2000, where he served as James R. Barker Professor of Contemporary Civilization. In 2023, he joined Princeton as Smith Family Professor of History.

As a history professor, Jones is also an academic in the fields of data science and cybersecurity. He has published widely on big data, surveillance, and artificial intelligence.

== Awards ==
While at Columbia, Jones received a Guggenheim Fellowship (2012), a Mellon Foundation New Directions Fellowship (2012), an Alfred P. Sloan Foundation grant, and multiple grants from the National Science Foundation. Jones is also a Future Flourishing Fellow of CIFAR.

== Publications ==
Books include: The Good Life in the Scientific Revolution (2006), Reckoning with Matter (2016), and How Data Happened (2023).
