= Pugs (compiler) =

Haskell implementation of Perl 6

- Original author: Audrey Tang
- Initial release: 1 February 2005; 20 years ago
- Final release: Final / 21 April 2010; 15 years ago
- Repository: github.com/perl6/Pugs.hs
- Written in: Haskell
- Platform: IA-32, x86-64
- Type: compiler–interpreter

Pugs is a compiler and interpreter for the Raku programming language, begun on 1 February 2005, by Audrey Tang. Raku was then called Perl 6.

As of 21 April 2010, Pugs development was placed on hiatus, with most Raku implementation efforts moving to Rakudo.

== Overview ==
The Pugs project aimed to bootstrap Perl 6 by implementing the full Perl 6 specification, as detailed in the Synopses. It is written in Haskell, specifically targeting the Glasgow Haskell Compiler.

Pugs includes two main executables:

- Pugs is the interpreter with an interactive shell.
- Pugscc can compile Perl 6 programs into Haskell code, Perl 5, JavaScript, or Parrot virtual machine's Parrot intermediate representation (PIR) assembly language.

Pugs is free and open-source software, distributable under the terms of either the GNU General Public License or the Artistic License. These are the same terms as Perl.

== Version numbering ==
The major/minor version numbers of Pugs converge to 2π (being reminiscent of TeX and Metafont, which use a similar scheme); each significant digit in the minor version represents a successfully completed milestone. The third digit is incremented for each release. The current milestones are:

- 6.0: Initial release
- 6.2: Basic IO and control flow elements; mutable variables; assignment
- 6.28: Classes and traits
- 6.283: Rules and Grammars
- 6.2831: Type system and linking
- 6.28318: Macros
- 6.283185: Port Pugs to Perl 6, if needed

== Perl 5 compatibility ==
As of version 6.2.6, Pugs also has the ability to embed Perl 5 and use CPAN modules installed on the system. The example below demonstrates the use of the popular Perl DBI module to manage a database:

#!/usr/bin/pugs
use v6;
use perl5:DBI;

my $dbh = DBI.connect('dbi:SQLite:dbname=test.db');
$dbh.do("CREATE TABLE Test (Project, Pumpking)");

my $sth = $dbh.prepare("INSERT INTO Test VALUES (?, ?)");
$sth.execute(<PGE Patrick>);
$sth.execute(<Pugs Audrey>);
$sth.execute(<Parrot Leo>);

my $res = $dbh.selectall_hashref('SELECT * FROM Test', 'Pumpking');
# Just another Pugs hacker
say "Just another $res<Audrey><Project> hacker";

== Development model ==
Several factors have been suggested as reasons for Pugs's progress:

- Haskell's static typing can make it easier for program bugs to be detected at compile time. Haskell code is also often thought to be concise. The Parsec library , a monadic combinatorial parser written fully in Haskell, simplifies parsing. Because Haskell is a purely functional programming language, making the functional code interact with the real world (input/output and time-driven environment) requires thought. To achieve this, Pugs makes extensive use of monads.
- Pugs's use of test-driven development methodology (a tenet of Extreme Programming). This methodology dictates that every module should have test code, even before the modules are implemented. Advocates of this methodology argue that it improves software quality. However, the project often silenced failed regression tests before releases, removing much of the benefit of test-driven development.
- Tang's liberal granting of the commit bit. Pugs development is currently based around a Subversion repository, and access is freely given, especially to people wishing to write tests. Because of this, a huge library of tests has accumulated. Other Perl 6 implementations rely on many tests developed for Pugs as an executable specification for Perl 6.
- Tang's communication style; her journal (linked below) attracted many people to the project.

Despite these factors, progress on the Haskell implementation stalled in late 2006, as personal issues kept Audrey from devoting as much time to the project as she had in 2005.

Many Pugs contributors have since moved on to implement Perl6-inspired systems as CPAN modules on Perl 5, such as the Moose project.
