= Dan Sugalski =

Software engineer

Dan Sugalski was the initial designer and chief architect for the Parrot process virtual machine that was initially created to run Perl 6. In 2005 Dan handed over Parrot lead duties to Chip Salzenberg and shortly thereafter left the Parrot project.

Dan was a Perl 5 core developer for years and his duties included being responsible for the VMS port of Perl. He has written more than a dozen Perl modules, does Perl training and has been a contributor to The Perl Journal and The Perl Review, as well as the O'Reilly Network.

After leaving the Parrot project, Sugalski wrote what he called a post-mortem, giving his final thoughts.
