= Allison Randal =

American computer scientist

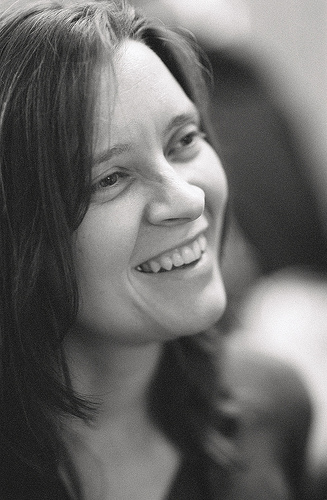
- Occupations: Programmer, Author
- Employer: SUSE
- Known for: Perl, Parrot

Allison Randal is a software developer and author. She was the chief architect of the Parrot virtual machine, a member of the board of directors for The Perl Foundation, a director of the Python Software Foundation from 2010 to 2012, and the chairman of the Parrot Foundation. She is also the lead developer of Punie, the port of Perl 1 to Parrot. She is co-author of Perl 6 and Parrot Essentials and the Synopses of Perl 6. She was employed by O'Reilly Media. From August 2010 till February 2012, Randal was the Technical Architect of Ubuntu at Canonical.

In Eastern Africa, Allison started her career as a research linguist, analyzing natural languages. She eventually shifted to studying artificial languages. Her working life includes educational games, linguistic analysis tools, e-commerce infrastructure, compilers, hypervisors, database replication systems, deployment automation, mobile applications, and voice-integrated smart-home technologies. During her career, she has specialized in unique integration of systems, technology, and language.

In 2009, Randal was chair of O'Reilly's Open Source Convention (OSCON). She was elected a fellow of the Python Software Foundation in 2010.

She was a director of the Open Source Initiative and was its president between 2015 and 2017, taking over from and handing back to Simon Phipps. She also serves on the OpenStack Foundation board of directors. She became the chair of board from 2021 to 2022.

Additionally, as of 2019, Randal joined the member of the board at Software Freedom Conservatory, and as of 2022, she became the chair of board.

From 2018-2024, Randal took a research sabbatical to complete her PhD at the university of Cambridge.
