= GLK =

GLK may refer to:

== Places ==
- Abdullahi Yusuf Airport, serving Galkayo, Somalia
- Gay and Lesbian Kingdom of the Coral Sea Islands, a micronation established as a symbolic political protest by a group of gay rights activists based in Australia

== People ==
- The Gaslamp Killer (born 1982), American record producer

== Others ==
- Glk (software), a portable API for text interfaces
- Gilaki language (ISO 639-3: glk), a Caspian language, and a member of the northwestern Iranian language branch, spoken in Iran's Gilan Province
- Glucokinase, an enzyme that facilitates phosphorylation of glucose to glucose-6-phosphate.
- Mercedes-Benz GLK-Class, a German sport utility vehicle
