= Punie =

Punie is a compiler created as a test case for the Parrot virtual machine. Its goal is to compile Perl v1 code and thereby exercise Parrot's compiler tools.

== Status ==
The project is championed by Allison Randal, though several other Parrot hackers have contributed to the project. As of the release of Parrot 0.5.1 on Perl's 20th anniversary, Punie was capable of running almost the entire Perl 1 test suite successfully.

== Name ==
The name Punie is a pun on the Ponie project (an implementation of Perl 5 running on Parrot), on "uni" meaning "1" (Perl 1), and on "puny" meaning something small. The name was first suggested for an implementation of Perl 1 on Parrot by Allison Randal and chromatic in a late-night hacking session in August 2003. It narrowly missed being named Penie.
