= PASM =

PASM may refer to:

- Parrot assembly language, in computing
- Pima Air & Space Museum, in Tucson, Arizona, US
- Program, aperture priority, shutter priority, and manual modes on the mode dial in many cameras
- St. Mary's Airport (Alaska) (ICAO airport code), US
- Porsche Active Suspension Management, an electronic damping control system
