= Java Model Railroad Interface =

Open-source software suite for controlling model railroads

Java Model Railroad Interface (JMRI) is an open source program for model railroad hobbyists, released under GNU General Public License v2. It allows users to control LED lights, horn, or switch the railway of hobbyist open-source or commercials closed-sourced trains.

JMRI is a suite of tools distributed via a single download. The two most popular tools are DecoderPro for programming Digital Command Control (DCC) decoders, and PanelPro for controlling layouts.

== History ==
Starting in 2005, JMRI's project administrator, Bob Jacobsen, was involved in a legal dispute with Matt Katzer in the United States District Court for the Northern District of California. Significantly, the United States Court of Appeals for the Federal Circuit ruled that infringing on the copyright of open source software by violating its license terms could result in monetary damages. The case was settled in early 2010.

== See also ==
Jacobsen v. Katzer
