= Jacobsen v. Katzer =

- Court: United States District Court for the Northern District of California
- Full case name: Robert Jacobsen v. Matthew Katzer and Kamind Associates, Inc.
- Docket nos.: 3:06-cv-01905
- Citation: 609 F. Supp. 2d 925

Case history
- Subsequent action: 535 F.3d 1373 (Fed. Cir. 2008)

Court membership
- Judge sitting: Jeffrey White

Keywords
- copyright, patent invalidity, cybersquatting

Jacobsen v. Katzer was a lawsuit between Robert Jacobsen (plaintiff) and Matthew Katzer (defendant), filed March 13, 2006 in the United States District Court for the Northern District of California. The case addressed claims on copyright, patent invalidity, cybersquatting, and Digital Millennium Copyright Act issues arising from Jacobsen under an open source license developing control software for model trains.

In ruling on summary judgment motions the Northern District Judge ruled that liability for an open source copyright violation nevertheless did not support Plaintiff's claim for damages. The Ruling rendered Plaintiff's claim pointless since the Plaintiff could not recover money damages. The Federal Circuit Court of Appeals reversed the trial judge holding an open source copyright claim was enforceable and awarded damages. The case then settled on February 16, 2010. The case is noted for its contentiousness, with over 400 docket items (including motions, pleadings, as well as court orders) entered at the trial court, and two appeals to the Federal Circuit Court of Appeals.

The Jacobsen case is noteworthy in United States copyright law because Courts clarified the enforceability of licensing agreements on both open-source software and proprietary software. The case established the rule of law that terms and conditions of the Artistic License 1.0 (SPDX ID Artistic‑1.0) are "enforceable copyright conditions".

== Background ==
Jacobsen, a model railroad hobbyist and a programmer, started the Java Model Railroad Interface (JMRI) Project along with other software developers in 2000, on the open-source incubation website SourceForge.net. The goal of the project was to create interfaces that would allow model trains to be controlled on a layout of model train tracks. The software created by the JMRI community was distributed without charge on the Internet, subject to the terms of the Artistic License. JMRI also sells custom software directly to modelers and to dealers for resale. JMRI's sales have qualified JMRI for membership as a business in the Model Railroad Industry Association (MRIA).

Defendant Katzer is the owner of KAMIND Associates Inc., an Oregon company doing business under the name KAM Industries. KAM produced and sold beginning in 1997 a commercial product for model trains, Train Tools, based on client-server software.

Katzer owns several patents that may apply to the model railroad industry, one of which he alleged the JMRI project may infringe. Jacobsen, however, alleged that Katzer's software utilizes textual files from the JMRI project, in violation of copyright and the DMCA. Katzer subsequently countersued Jacobsen for $6 million for copyright infringement.

In addition to the patent claims, there was also a dispute over websites. In February 2004, Katzer registered the web domain decoderpro.com; however, DecoderPro is the trademarked name for a JMRI program. Jacobsen succeeded in obtaining the return of the domain name.

== Litigation history ==
=== Initial actions ===
Both Jacobsen and Katzer moved for summary judgment and the district court ruled on the parties' Motions in December 2009.

=== Summary judgment ===
The summary judgment deals with a series of submissions presented by Jacobsen (plaintiff) and Katzer (defendant). Responses to initial submissions were filed on November 13. Both plaintiff and defendant further replied to responses on November 19 and 20. Prior to oral arguments on December 4, Judge Jeffrey S. White issued a Notice of Tentative Ruling and Questions, tentatively affirming in part and denying in part Jacobsen's motion for summary judgment and tentatively denying Katzer's motion for summary judgment.

On December 10, 2009, the judge denied Katzer's motion, concluding that Jacobsen could copyright the selection and ordering of the decoder definition files and could show monetary damages for copyright infringement. In the same ruling, he granted in part and denied in part Jacobsen's motion, finding that Katzer did register the decoderpro.com domain name in bad faith, that Katzer is liable for copyright infringement of the decoder definition files and that Katzer's counterclaim for copyright infringement is barred by the doctrine of laches (damaged argument), and ruled that Jacobsen had a license under an "Implied License" doctrine. The judge did not rule on damages for copyright infringement and determined that the questions of Katzer's knowledge or intent in removing copyright notices are triable issues.

=== Settlement ===
The parties reached settlement on February 16, 2010, and the settlement paid on March 5, 2010.

The basic terms of the Mutual Settlement Agreement included the Parties agreeing:

1. To a permanent injunction enjoining Katzer from "reproducing, by download or others, JMRI material, modifying JMRI material or distributing JMRI material".
2. The Settlement forever barred each from pursuit of claims, known or unknown existing up to the settlement date, against the other. The Agreement pertained to "all claims based on or related to JMRI Material". This settlement term applied to JMRI, JMRI end-users, and JMRI developers to the date of settlement payment.
3. To dismiss all pending matters, including Federal Circuit appeal, Jacobsen v Katzer et al., No. 2009-1221.
4. Katzer/KAM agreed on a payment of $100,000 to Jacobsen.
5. The settlement agreement terminated all Oral and Implied licenses between parties.
6. Not to initiate legal proceedings against each other for 10 years, and to refer future disputes to arbitration. This applied only to Jacobsen and Katzer/KAM, not to JMRI, JMRI end users, or JMRI developers.
7. That the Settlement Agreement does not pertain to newly issued Katzer IP, or any later JMRI software versions, appearing after the settlement date.

As required by the Settlement Agreement, the defendant paid the plaintiff $100,000 on March 5, 2010.

== Specific issues ==
=== Copyright claims ===
KAM received a copyright infringement notification from Jacobsen on September 11, 2006, and on the same day Jacobsen filed an amended complaint that included a claim for copyright infringement. On the same day KAM removed allegedly infringing materials from KAM's website. In Jacobsen's declaration, in support of a motion for a preliminary injunction, he specifically identified examples of alleged copyright infringement.

In August 2007, the district court denied Jacobsen's request for declaratory judgment, holding that the "defendants' alleged violation of the conditions of the license may have constituted a breach of the nonexclusive license, but does not create liability for copyright infringement." The judge stated that JMRI failed to allege claims that were the proximate cause of a breach of the Artistic License.

On December 28, 2007, a coalition of non-profit organizations and open-source advocates filed an amicus curiae brief in support of Jacobsen's appeal. The brief was led by the Creative Commons Corporation and joined by the Linux Foundation, the Open Source Initiative, the Software Freedom Law Center, The Perl Foundation (acting as Yet Another Society), and the Wikimedia Foundation. The amici argued that the district court's interpretation of the Artistic License threatened the economic and legal viability of the open-source software model by limiting the remedies available for license violations.

In August 2008, the United States Court of Appeals for the Federal Circuit vacated the district court's ruling, holding that the terms of the Artistic License are enforceable copyright conditions, and sent the case back to the district court. The appeals court said, "Open source licensing has become a widely used method of creative collaboration that serves to advance the arts and sciences in a manner and at a pace that few could have imagined just a few decades ago," and cited as examples "the GNU/Linux operating system, the Perl programming language, the Apache web server programs, the Firefox web browser, and a collaborative web-based encyclopedia called Wikipedia." Professor Lawrence Lessig called the ruling "a very important victory" that applies to all open source licenses, and many other news organizations commented on the finding.

In January 2009, the District Court again ruled on the preliminary motions, saying that it would hear Jacobsen's copyright claims but denying Jacobsen a preliminary injunction due to a lack of evidence showing any specific and actual harm.

In June 2009, the Software Freedom Law Center filed an amicus brief before the Court of Appeals for the Federal Circuit (CAFC) calling for injunctive relief for open source developers. In the brief, SFLC argues that a Free, Libre, and Open Source Software (FLOSS) developer whose license has been violated should be able to call upon the courts to prevent further infringing distributions. The brief outlines harm to developers, development communities, and project productivity related to open source license violations.

Jacobsen based his case on an assertion of a copyright on behalf of a free software project that is otherwise extremely generous in granting permissions for downstream copying, modifying, and distributing its works. Jacobsen explains that the basis of his copyright claims is that 102 files defining 291 decoders of the 500 decoders available on the market are at issue in this claim. JMRI developers chose the decoders they found most interesting and useful, and then structured the resulting definition files in a unique way, not based upon manufacturer or NMRA approaches, but reflecting the judgment of the JMRI developers as to their preferred arrangement, particularly choosing an arrangement appropriate for integrating these files with the rest of the JMRI software.

=== Patent claims ===
Katzer asserted that after he shipped model train software that used a client/server protocol in July 1997, he filed a patent application within the United States one year statutory period, namely in June 1998, with the United States Patent and Trademark Office, consisting of 53 method claims for client/server control of model trains by computer software.

On April 14, 2002, the JMRI project published a new capability in their code, over 4 years after KAM presented their client/server architecture, which allowed a computer to control the layout of a model railroad via a client/server protocol. On April 17, 2002, Katzer filed a continuation patent application, with a priority date back to 1998, with the patent office claiming those exact capabilities. On March 11, 2003, the patent office granted the patent (the "'329 patent") claiming those exact capabilities. Another model train software supplier, DigiToys Systems, produced software called WinLok, including functionality purported to be prior art. This information was provided to the file history of the '329 patent, which is the parent of the pending continuation patent. Manual Patent Examining Procedures 707.05 states "In all continuation and continuation-in-part applications, the parent applications should be reviewed for pertinent prior art." Accordingly, the references cited by the two model railroad hobbyists were before the patent office in the '329 patent.

On March 8, 2005, Katzer sent patent infringement letters and bills to Jacobsen, claiming that the code in the JMRI project infringed his patent, and that more than $200,000 was due for licensing fees of previously distributed versions of the project. Jacobsen filed for a declaratory judgment against Katzer. In it, Jacobsen alleged that the June 1998 patent is invalid due to prior art, that Katzer deliberately failed to provide the patent office with the prior art, and that Katzer's patents had been granted by the patent office in error.

On February 1, 2009, Katzer filed two disclaimers with the U.S. Patent Office, effectively making two of his patents unenforceable in their entirety. The result of the disclaimer was to remove all patent issues from the case. KAM stated that the disclaimer of the '329 patent was purely based upon economic considerations to avoid the cost of patent litigation.

=== Cybersquatting claims ===
In July 2001, JMRI began calling one of its subprojects "DecoderPro". In February 2004, Katzer purchased the domain decoderpro.com. After this was mentioned on a (non-JMRI) model railroad software mailing list, Jerry Britton (a JMRI user/member) purchased and began using the domain name computerdispatcherpro.com, in apparent violation of Katzer's trademark on Computer Dispatcher. He also threatened to point KAM's computerdispatcherpro.com to a "good porn site". Katzer sued Britton to force him to stop infringing on the computerdispatcherpro.com trademark, and prevent Britton from pointing the domain name to such a site, and Jacobsen asked Katzer to transfer the decoderpro.com domain to him.

A settlement agreement between Britton and Katzer resulted in Britton transferring computerdispatcherpro.com to Katzer, and Katzer in turn transferring decoderpro.com to Britton. The agreement allowed Britton to point the domain to the JMRI decoderpro project site, but also prohibited Britton from transferring the domain name without Katzer's permission.

Jacobsen included a demand for return of decoderpro.com in his lawsuit against Katzer. He also filed an action with the World Intellectual Property Organization (WIPO) against fellow JMRI user Jerry Britton, asking that they settle the matter per the Uniform Domain Name Dispute Resolution Policy (UDNDP); Britton did not respond to the action. On July 26, 2007, WIPO found in favor of Jacobsen, ruling that Katzer's actions were found to be in "bad faith", since "there was essentially a purpose on the part of Katzer to disrupt the business of a competitor by interfering with Complainant's exercise of his trademark rights". In the December 2009 Summary Judgement decision, the Federal Court concurred that Katzer had illegally cybersquatted on the decoderpro.com domain name.

=== Digital Millennium Copyright Act claims ===
In his second amended complaint against Katzer, Jacobsen included a section alleging that Katzer violated section 102 of the Digital Millennium Copyright Act by removing or altered copyright management information.

In response, Katzer filed a motion to dismiss the DMCA claims, stating that "information [that] does not encrypt or control access ... but ... 'functions to inform people who make copyright decisions" did not fall under the DMCA. However, in December 2009, the court ruled that Katzer's removal of the JMRI copyright information was a removal of copyright management information under the DMCA, leaving the question of intent under the DMCA, and damages under the DMCA to be proved at trial.
