= NcFTP =

FTP client program

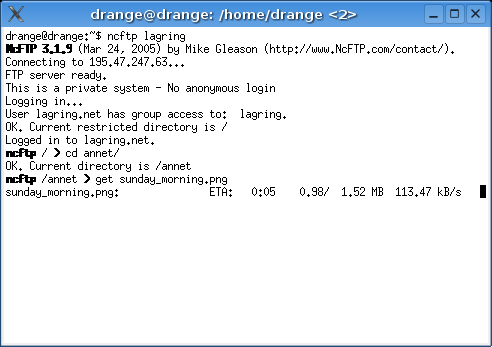
- NcFTP downloading a file
- Original author: Mike Gleason
- Developer: NcFTP Software Inc.
- Release: 1991
- Stable release: 3.3.0 / 23 April 2025; 15 months ago
- Written in: C
- Operating system: Cross-platform
- Type: FTP client
- License: Clarified Artistic License
- Website: www.ncftpd.com/ncftp/

NcFTP is an FTP client program which debuted in 1991 as the first alternative FTP client. It was created as an alternative to the standard UNIX ftp program, and offers a number of additional features and greater ease of use.

NcFTP is a command-line user interface program, and runs on a large number of platforms.

== See also ==
- NcFTPd
- Lftp
- Wget
