= Perl Foundation =

Open-source computing organization

The Perl & Raku Foundation
- Abbreviation: TPRF
- Formation: September 5, 2000
- Type: 501(c)(3) nonprofit organization
- Headquarters: Holland, Michigan, United States
- Revenue: $41,442 (2023)
- Website: perlfoundation.org

The Perl and Raku Foundation (TPRF), also known as Yet Another Society, is a non-profit, 501(c)(3) organization based in Holland, Michigan. It is dedicated to the advancement of the Perl and Raku programming languages through open discussion, collaboration, design, and code. The Perl Foundation fulfills a range of activities which includes, "the collection and distribution of development grants, sponsorship and organization of community-led local and international Perl conferences, and support for community web sites and user groups."

== Projects and activities ==
The Perl Foundation supports the use and development of Perl in many ways:

- Supporting international YAPCs
- Awarding grants for Perl projects
- Network infrastructure operations, which support community websites such as PerlMonks.org, Perl Mongers, and perl.org
- Holding trademarks
- Annually issuing the Perl White Camel award

TPRF have been an official organization in the Google Summer of Code.

== Governance ==
The day-to-day business of TPF is run by several committees including the grants committee and conferences committee. These committees report to the TPF steering committee, which directs the operations of TPF. All of these groups are overseen by a board of directors. All TPF members, including the board of directors, are volunteers.

== Legal and licensing ==
The foundation acts as the legal steward for the Artistic License, the open-source license originally authored by Larry Wall for the Perl core. In this capacity, the foundation maintains the license text and oversaw the development of the Artistic License 2.0 to improve legal clarity and compatibility with other free software licenses.

In 2007, the foundation (operating under its legal name, Yet Another Society) participated as an amicus curiae in the landmark case Jacobsen v. Katzer. While the software at the center of the dispute (the Java Model Railroad Interface) was not written in Perl, it was distributed under the Artistic License 1.0. The foundation joined a coalition including the Wikimedia Foundation and Creative Commons to argue that the license's terms—specifically attribution requirements—were enforceable conditions of a copyright license rather than mere contractual covenants. The resulting 2008 ruling by the United States Court of Appeals for the Federal Circuit was a significant victory for the foundation and the broader open-source community, establishing that open-source licenses are enforceable under federal copyright law.
