= NcFTPd =

- Original author(s): Mike Gleason
- Developer(s): NcFTP Software Inc.
- Initial release: 1991
- Stable release: 2.8.8 / 11 January 2024; 14 months ago
- Written in: C
- Operating system: Unix-like
- Type: FTP server
- License: Proprietary
- Website: www.ncftp.com/ncftpd/

NcFTPd is the FTP server written by NcFTP Software Inc. Unlike the client application from the same company, NcFTP, NcFTPd is distributed under a proprietary license. Having been released in 1991 with continuing releases through 2012, it is one of the most venerable server software in use on the Internet.

== See also ==
- NcFTP
