= Glulx =

Virtual machine for interactive fiction games

- Designer: Andrew Plotkin
- Bits: 32
- Introduced: 1999
- Version: 3.1.3 (2022)
- Design: CISC
- Endianness: Big
- Open: Yes

Glulx is a 32-bit portable virtual machine intended for writing and playing interactive fiction. It was designed by Andrew Plotkin to relieve some of the restrictions in the Z-machine format. For example, because the Z-machine uses 16-bit integers its RAM is limited to 64KB, while Glulx natively supports 32-bit integers and has a 32-bit address space, allowing gigabytes of memory. Glulx programs typically use the Glk API for input and output. In recent years Glulx has overtaken the Z-machine in terms of published works in each format.

== Compilers and interpreters ==
The Inform compiler, starting with version 6.30, can produce either Z-machine or Glulx story files. A Spanish interactive fiction development system called Superglús also uses Glulx.

The reference interpreter is Andrew Plotkin's Glulxe, but the Git interpreter is often used as it is somewhat faster. There is also a JavaScript interpreter called Quixe.

== File and MIME types ==
The MIME type for Glulx is "application/x-glulx". Glulx files have the file extension .ulx, but they are commonly archived in Blorb packages. For Blorb packages containing a Glulx work, accepted file extensions are .gblorb, .glb, .blorb and .blb. The former two extensions are intended to make it easy for interpreters to figure out which type of game is inside the Blorb file.

== Works published in Glulx ==
- Counterfeit Monkey
- The Wizard Sniffer
- Photopia
