= Rakudo =

- Stable release: "2026.11" / November 14, 2026; 0 days ago
- Written in: Raku
- Operating system: Linux, Windows, FreeBSD, OS X, NetBSD, OpenBSD
- Type: Raku (v6.c, v6.d) Compiler
- License: Artistic License 2.0
- Website: rakudo.org
- Repository: github.com/rakudo/rakudo

Rakudo is a Raku compiler targeting MoarVM, and the Java Virtual Machine, that implements the Raku specification.

Originally developed within the Parrot project, the Rakudo source code repository was split from the project in February 2009 so that it could be developed independently, although there were still many dependencies at the time. Rakudo is written in C, Raku, and the lightweight Raku subset NQP (Not Quite Perl).

Rakudo #14 was released in February 2009, codenamed Vienna after the Perl mongers group that had sponsored one of its developers since April 2008.

The first major release of a distribution of both compiler and modules (named "Rakudo *" or "Rakudo Star") was on July 29, 2010.

== Name ==
The name "Rakudo" for the Raku compiler was first suggested by Damian Conway. "Rakudo" is short for "Rakuda-dō" (with a long 'o'; 駱駝道), which is Japanese for "Way of the Camel". "Rakudo" (with a short 'o'; 楽土) also means "paradise" in Japanese.

The term "Rakudo" was also chosen to distinguish between the name of a language implementation ("Rakudo") from the name of the language specification ("Raku") – any implementation that passes the official test suite may call itself "Raku".
