= MoarVM =

Virtual machine for Raku

- Stable release: 2026.11 / 14 November 2026; 0 days ago
- Written in: C
- Operating system: Cross-platform
- Predecessor: Parrot virtual machine
- Type: Virtual machine
- License: Artistic License 2.0
- Website: www.moarvm.org
- Repository: github.com/MoarVM/MoarVM

MoarVM (Metamodel On A Runtime Virtual Machine) is a virtual machine built for the 6model object system. It is being built to serve as yet another VM backend for Raku. MoarVM was created to allow for greater efficiency than Parrot by having a closer internal representation to the model system used by Raku. Notably it was the virtual machine for the first stable version of Rakudo released in December 2015.

Work began on MoarVM on March 31, 2012; the project was first publicly announced the following year on May 31, 2013.

As of March 2014, it is the fastest virtual machine for Rakudo and NQP in terms of startup time and build speed.

MoarVM is available under the Artistic License 2.0.
