= Perl =

Interpreted programming language first released in 1987

- Paradigm: Multi-paradigm
- Designed by: Larry Wall
- Developer: Larry Wall
- First appeared: December 18, 1987; 38 years ago
- Stable release: 5.44.0 / 15 July 2026; 4 months ago
- Preview release: 5.45.5 / 19 November 2026; 0 days ago
- Typing discipline: Dynamic
- Implementation language: C
- OS: Cross-platform
- License: Artistic 1.0 or GNU General Public License version 1 or any later version
- Filename extensions: .plx, .pls, .pl, .pm, .xs, .t, .pod, .cgi, .psgi
- Website: perl.org

Influenced by
- AWK, BASIC, C, C++, Lisp, sed, Unix shell

Influenced
- CoffeeScript, Groovy, JavaScript, Julia, LPC, PHP, Python, Raku, Ruby, PowerShell

Perl is a high-level, general-purpose, interpreted, dynamic programming language. Though Perl is not officially an acronym, there are various backronyms in use, including "Practical Extraction and Reporting Language".

Perl was developed by Larry Wall in 1987 as a general-purpose Unix scripting language to make report processing easier. Since then, it has undergone many changes and revisions. Perl originally was not capitalized and the name was changed to being capitalized by the time Perl 4 was released. The latest release is Perl 5, first released in 1994. From 2000 to October 2019 a sixth version of Perl was in development; the sixth version's name was changed to Raku. Both languages continue to be developed independently by different development teams which liberally borrow ideas from each other.

Perl borrows features from other programming languages including C, sh, AWK, and sed. It provides text processing facilities without the arbitrary data-length limits of many contemporary Unix command line tools. Perl is a highly expressive programming language: source code for a given algorithm can be short and highly compressible.

Perl gained widespread popularity in the mid-1990s as a CGI scripting language, in part due to its powerful regular expression and string parsing abilities. In addition to CGI, Perl 5 is used for system administration, network programming, finance, bioinformatics, and other applications, such as for graphical user interfaces (GUIs). It has been nicknamed "the Swiss Army chainsaw of scripting languages" because of its flexibility and power. In 1998, it was also referred to as the "duct tape that holds the Internet together", in reference to both its ubiquitous use as a glue language and its perceived inelegance.

== Name and logos ==
The Camel symbol used by O'Reilly Media

The onion logo used by The Perl Foundation

Perl was originally named "Pearl". Wall wanted to give the language a short name with positive connotations. However, Wall discovered the existing PEARL language before Perl's official release and dropped the "a" from the name.

The name is occasionally expanded as a backronym: Practical Extraction and Report Language and Wall's own Pathologically Eclectic Rubbish Lister, which is in the manual page for perl.

Programming Perl, published by O'Reilly Media, features a picture of a dromedary camel on the cover and is commonly called the "Camel Book". This image has become an unofficial symbol of Perl. O'Reilly owns the image as a trademark but licenses it for non-commercial use, requiring only an acknowledgement and a link to www.perl.com. Licensing for commercial use is decided on a case-by-case basis. O'Reilly also provides "Programming Republic of Perl" logos for non-commercial sites and "Powered by Perl" buttons for any site that uses Perl.

The Perl Foundation owns an alternative symbol, an onion, which it licenses to its subsidiaries, Perl Mongers, PerlMonks, Perl.org, and others. The symbol is a visual pun on pearl onion.

In 2024, a new camel logo for the language was published under a Creative Commons license by a small group of developers. While not an official logo, it is intended to represent both the language and the community and draws on Perl's longtime association with the camel from the O'Reilly book.

== History ==
=== Early versions ===
Larry Wall began work on Perl in 1987, while employed as a programmer at Unisys; he released version 1.0 on December 18, 1987. Wall based early Perl on some methods existing languages used for text manipulation.

Perl 2, released in June 1988, featured a better regular expression engine. Perl 3, released in October 1989, added support for binary data streams.

=== 1990s ===
Originally, the only documentation for Perl was a single lengthy man page. In 1991, Programming Perl, known to many Perl programmers as the "Camel Book" because of its cover, was published and became the de facto reference for the language. At the same time, the Perl version number was bumped to 4, not to mark a major change in the language but to identify the version that was well documented by the book. Perl 4 was released in March 1991.

Perl 4 went through a series of maintenance releases, culminating in Perl 4.036 in 1993, whereupon Wall abandoned Perl 4 to begin work on Perl 5. Initial design of Perl 5 continued into 1994. The perl5-porters mailing list was established in May 1994 to coordinate work on porting Perl 5 to different platforms. It remains the primary forum for development, maintenance, and porting of Perl 5.

Perl 5.000 was released on October 17, 1994. It was a nearly complete rewrite of the interpreter, and it added many new features to the language, including objects, references, lexical (my) variables, and modules. Importantly, modules provided a mechanism for extending the language without modifying the interpreter. This allowed the core interpreter to stabilize, even as it enabled ordinary Perl programmers to add new language features. Perl 5 has been in active development since then.

Perl 5.001 was released on March 13, 1995. Perl 5.002 was released on February 29, 1996 with the new prototypes feature. This allowed module authors to make subroutines that behaved like Perl builtins. Perl 5.003 was released June 25, 1996, as a security release.

One of the most important events in Perl 5 history took place outside of the language proper and was a consequence of its module support. On October 26, 1995, the Comprehensive Perl Archive Network (CPAN) was established as a repository for the Perl language and Perl modules; as of December 2022, it carries over 211,850 modules in 43,865 distributions, written by more than 14,324 authors, and is mirrored worldwide at more than 245 locations.

Perl 5.004 was released on May 15, 1997, and included, among other things, the UNIVERSAL package, giving Perl a base object from which all classes were automatically derived and the ability to require versions of modules. Another significant development was the inclusion of the CGI.pm module, which contributed to Perl's popularity as a CGI scripting language.

Perl 5.004 added support for Microsoft Windows, Plan 9, QNX, and AmigaOS.

Perl 5.005 was released on July 22, 1998. This release included several enhancements to the regex engine, new hooks into the backend through the B::* modules, the qr// regex quote operator, a large selection of other new core modules, and added support for several more operating systems, including BeOS.

=== 2000–2020 ===
Major version	Latest update
5.4	1999-04-29
5.5	2004-02-23
5.6	2003-11-15
5.8	2008-12-14
5.10	2009-08-22
5.12	2012-11-10
5.14	2013-03-10
5.16	2013-03-11
5.18	2014-10-01
5.20	2015-09-12
5.22	2017-07-15
5.24	2018-04-14
5.26	2018-11-29
5.28	2020-06-01
5.30	2020-06-01
5.32	2021-01-23
5.34	2023-11-29
5.36	2023-11-29
5.38	2025-08-03
5.40	2026-08-02
5.42	2026-08-02
5.44	2026-07-15
Unsupported Supported Latest version Preview version Future version

Perl 5.6 was released on March 22, 2000. Major changes included 64-bit support, Unicode string representation, support for files over 2 GiB, and the "our" keyword. When developing Perl 5.6, the decision was made to switch the versioning scheme to one more similar to other open source projects; after 5.005_63, the next version became 5.5.640, with plans for development versions to have odd numbers and stable versions to have even numbers.

In 2000, Wall put forth a call for suggestions for a new version of Perl from the community. The process resulted in 361 RFC (Request for Comments) documents that were to be used in guiding development of Perl 6. In 2001, work began on the "Apocalypses" for Perl 6, a series of documents meant to summarize the change requests and present the design of the next generation of Perl. They were presented as a digest of the RFCs, rather than a formal document. At this time, Perl 6 existed only as a description of a language.

Perl 5.8 was first released on July 18, 2002, and further 5.X versions have been released approximately yearly since then. Perl 5.8 improved Unicode support, added a new I/O implementation, added a new thread implementation, improved numeric accuracy, and added several new modules. As of 2013, this version was still the most popular Perl version and was used by Red Hat Linux 5, SUSE Linux 10, Solaris 10, HP-UX 11.31, and AIX 5.

In 2004, work began on the "Synopses" – documents that originally summarized the Apocalypses, but which became the specification for the Perl 6 language. In February 2005, Audrey Tang began work on Pugs, a Perl 6 interpreter written in Haskell. This was the first concerted effort toward making Perl 6 a reality. This effort stalled in 2006.

The Perl On New Internal Engine (PONIE) project existed from 2003 until 2006. It was to be a bridge between Perl 5 and 6, and an effort to rewrite the Perl 5 interpreter to run on the Perl 6 Parrot virtual machine. The goal was to ensure the future of the millions of lines of Perl 5 code at thousands of companies around the world. The PONIE project ended in 2006 and is no longer being actively developed. Some of the improvements made to the Perl 5 interpreter as part of PONIE were folded into that project.

On December 18, 2007, the 20th anniversary of Perl 1.0, Perl 5.10.0 was released. Perl 5.10.0 included notable new features, which brought it closer to Perl 6. These included a switch statement (called "given"/"when"), regular expressions updates, and the smart match operator (~~). Around this same time, development began in earnest on another implementation of Perl 6 known as Rakudo Perl, developed in tandem with the Parrot virtual machine. As of November 2009, Rakudo Perl has had regular monthly releases and now is the most complete implementation of Perl 6.

A major change in the development process of Perl 5 occurred with Perl 5.11; the development community has switched to a monthly release cycle of development releases, with a yearly schedule of stable releases. By that plan, bugfix point releases will follow the stable releases every three months.

On April 12, 2010, Perl 5.12.0 was released. Notable core enhancements include new package NAME VERSION syntax, the yada yada operator (intended to mark placeholder code that is not yet implemented), implicit strictures, full Y2038 compliance, regex conversion overloading, DTrace support, and Unicode 5.2.

On May 14, 2011, Perl 5.14 was released with JSON support built-in.

On May 20, 2012, Perl 5.16 was released. Notable new features include the ability to specify a given version of Perl that one wishes to emulate, allowing users to upgrade their version of Perl, but still run old scripts that would normally be incompatible. Perl 5.16 also updates the core to support Unicode 6.1.

On May 18, 2013, Perl 5.18 was released. Notable new features include the new dtrace hooks, lexical subs, more CORE:: subs, overhaul of the hash for security reasons, support for Unicode 6.2.

On May 27, 2014, Perl 5.20 was released. Notable new features include subroutine signatures, hash slices/new slice syntax, postfix dereferencing (experimental), Unicode 6.3, and a rand() function using a consistent random number generator.

Some observers credit the release of Perl 5.10 with the start of the Modern Perl movement. In particular, this phrase describes a style of development that embraces the use of the CPAN, takes advantage of recent developments in the language, and is rigorous about creating high quality code. While the book Modern Perl may be the most visible standard-bearer of this idea, other groups such as the Enlightened Perl Organization have taken up the cause.

In late 2012 and 2013, several projects for alternative implementations for Perl 5 started: Perl5 in Perl6 by the Rakudo Perl team, moe by Stevan Little and friends, p2 by the Perl11 team under Reini Urban, gperl by goccy, and rperl, a Kickstarter project led by Will Braswell and affiliated with the Perl11 project.

=== Perl 6 and Raku ===
Camelia, the logo for the Perl 6 project

At the 2000 Perl Conference, Jon Orwant made a case for a major new language initiative. This led to a decision to begin work on a redesign of the language, to be called Perl 6. Proposals for new language features were solicited from the Perl community at large, which submitted more than 300 RFCs.

Wall spent the next few years digesting the RFCs and synthesizing them into a coherent framework for Perl 6. He presented his design for Perl 6 in a series of documents called "apocalypses" – numbered to correspond to chapters in Programming Perl. As of January 2011, the developing specification of Perl 6 was encapsulated in design documents called Synopses – numbered to correspond to Apocalypses.

Thesis work by Bradley M. Kuhn, overseen by Wall, considered the possible use of the Java virtual machine as a runtime for Perl. Kuhn's thesis showed this approach to be problematic. In 2001, it was decided that Perl 6 would run on a cross-language virtual machine called Parrot.

In 2005, Audrey Tang created the Pugs project, an implementation of Perl 6 in Haskell. This acted as a test platform for the Perl 6 language (separate from the development of the actual implementation), allowing the language designers to explore. The Pugs project spawned an active Perl/Haskell cross-language community centered around the Libera Chat #raku IRC channel. Many functional programming influences were absorbed by the Perl 6 design team.

In 2012, Perl 6 development was centered primarily on two compilers:

1. Rakudo, an implementation running on the Parrot virtual machine and the Java virtual machine.
2. Niecza, which targets the Common Language Runtime.

In 2013, MoarVM ("Metamodel On A Runtime"), a C language-based virtual machine designed primarily for Rakudo was announced.

In October 2019, Perl 6 was renamed to Raku.

As of 2017 only the Rakudo implementation and MoarVM are under active development, and other virtual machines, such as the Java Virtual Machine and JavaScript, are supported.

=== Perl 7 ===
In June 2020, Perl 7 was announced as the successor to Perl 5. Perl 7 was to initially be based on Perl 5.32 with a release expected in first half of 2021, and release candidates sooner.

This plan was revised in May 2021, without any release timeframe or version of Perl 5 for use as a baseline specified. When Perl 7 would be released, Perl 5 would have gone into long term maintenance. Supported Perl 5 versions however would continue to get important security and bug fixes.

Perl 7 was announced on 24 June 2020 at "The Perl Conference in the Cloud" as the successor to Perl 5. Based on Perl 5.32, Perl 7 was planned to be backward compatible with modern Perl 5 code; Perl 5 code, without boilerplate (pragma) header needs adding use compat::perl5; to stay compatible, but modern code can drop some of the boilerplate.

The plan to go to Perl 7 brought up more discussion, however, and the Perl Steering Committee canceled it to avoid issues with backward compatibility for scripts that were not written to the pragmas and modules that would become the default in Perl 7. Perl 7 will only come out when the developers add enough features to warrant a major release upgrade.

== Design ==
=== Philosophy ===
According to Wall, Perl has two slogans. The first is "There's more than one way to do it," commonly known as TMTOWTDI, (pronounced Tim Toady). Proponents of this motto argue that this philosophy makes it easy to write concise statements. The second slogan is "Easy things should be easy and hard things should be possible".

The design of Perl can be understood as a response to three broad trends in the computer industry: falling hardware costs, rising labor costs, and improvements in compiler technology. Many earlier computer languages, such as Fortran and C, aimed to make efficient use of expensive computer hardware. In contrast, Perl was designed so that computer programmers could write programs more quickly and easily.

Perl has many features that ease the task of the programmer at the expense of greater CPU and memory requirements. These include automatic memory management; dynamic typing; strings, lists, and hashes; regular expressions; introspection; and an eval() function. Perl follows the theory of "no built-in limits", an idea similar to the zero–one–infinity rule.

Wall was trained as a linguist, and the design of Perl is very much informed by linguistic principles. Examples include Huffman coding (common constructions should be short), good end-weighting (the important information should come first), and a large collection of language primitives. Perl favors language constructs that are concise and natural for humans to write, even where they complicate the Perl interpreter.

Perl's syntax reflects the idea that "things that are different should look different." For example, scalars, arrays, and hashes have different leading sigils. Array indices and hash keys use different kinds of braces. Strings and regular expressions have different standard delimiters.

There is a broad practical bent to both the Perl language and the community and culture that surround it. The preface to Programming Perl begins: "Perl is a language for getting your job done." One consequence of this is that Perl is not a tidy language. It includes many features, tolerates exceptions to its rules, and employs heuristics to resolve syntactical ambiguities. Because of the forgiving nature of the compiler, bugs can sometimes be hard to find. Perl's function documentation remarks on the variant behavior of built-in functions in list and scalar contexts by saying, "In general, they do what you want, unless you want consistency."

=== Features ===
The overall structure of Perl derives broadly from C. Perl is procedural in nature, with variables, expressions, assignment statements, brace-delimited blocks, control structures, and subroutines.

Perl also takes features from shell programming. All variables are marked with leading sigils, which allow variables to be interpolated directly into strings. However, unlike the shell, Perl uses sigils on all accesses to variables, and unlike most other programming languages that use sigils, the sigil doesn't denote the type of the variable but the type of the expression. So for example, while an array is denoted by the sigil "@" (for example @arrayname), an individual member of the array is denoted by the scalar sigil "$" (for example $arrayname[3]). Perl also has many built-in functions that provide tools often used in shell programming (although many of these tools are implemented by programs external to the shell) such as sorting, and calling operating system facilities.

Perl takes hashes ("associative arrays") from AWK and regular expressions from sed. These simplify many parsing, text-handling, and data-management tasks. Shared with Lisp is the implicit return of the last value in a block, and all statements are also expressions which can be used in larger expressions themselves.

Perl 5 added features that support complex data structures, first-class functions (that is, closures as values), and an object-oriented programming model. These include references, packages, class-based method dispatch, and lexically scoped variables, along with compiler directives (for example, the strict pragma). A major additional feature introduced with Perl 5 was the ability to package code as reusable modules. Wall later stated that "The whole intent of Perl 5's module system was to encourage the growth of Perl culture rather than the Perl core."

All versions of Perl do automatic data-typing and automatic memory management. The interpreter knows the type and storage requirements of every data object in the program; it allocates and frees storage for them as necessary using reference counting (so it cannot deallocate circular data structures without manual intervention). Legal type conversions – for example, conversions from number to string – are done automatically at run time; illegal type conversions are fatal errors.

=== Syntax ===
Perl has been referred to as "line noise" and a "write-only language" by its critics. Randal L. Schwartz in the first edition of the book Learning Perl, in the first chapter states: "Yes, sometimes Perl looks like line noise to the uninitiated, but to the seasoned Perl programmer, it looks like checksummed line noise with a mission in life." He also stated that the accusation that Perl is a write-only language could be avoided by coding with "proper care". The Perl overview document perlintro states that the names of built-in "magic" scalar variables "look like punctuation or line noise". However, the English module provides both long and short English alternatives. perlstyle document states that line noise in regular expressions could be mitigated using the /x modifier to add whitespace.

According to the Perl 6 FAQ, Perl 6 was designed to mitigate "the usual suspects" that elicit the "line noise" claim from Perl 5 critics, including the removal of "the majority of the punctuation variables" and the sanitization of the regex syntax. The Perl 6 FAQ also states that what is sometimes referred to as Perl's line noise is "the actual syntax of the language" just as gerunds and prepositions are a part of the English language. In a December 2012 blog posting, despite claiming that "Rakudo Perl 6 has failed and will continue to fail unless it gets some adult supervision", chromatic stated that the design of Perl 6 has a "well-defined grammar", an "improved type system, a unified object system with an intelligent metamodel, metaoperators, and a clearer system of context that provides for such niceties as pervasive laziness." He also stated that "Perl 6 has a coherence and a consistency that Perl 5 lacks."

In Perl, one could write the "Hello, World!" program as:

print "Hello, World!\n";

Here is a more complex Perl program, that counts down seconds from a given starting value:

#!/usr/bin/env perl
use strict;
use warnings;

my ( $remaining, $total );

$remaining=$total=shift(@ARGV);

STDOUT->autoflush(1);

while ( $remaining ) {
    printf ( "Remaining %s/%s \r", $remaining--, $total );
    sleep 1;
}

print "\n";

To run the code above, store it in a file named counter.pl, and then execute it.

$ perl counter.pl 42

The Perl interpreter can also be used for one-off scripts on the command line. The following example (as invoked from an sh-compatible shell, such as Bash) translates the string "Bob" in all files ending with .txt in the current directory to "Robert":

$ perl -i.bak -lp -e 's/Bob/Robert/g' *.txt

=== Implementation ===
No written specification or standard for the Perl language exists for Perl versions through Perl 5, and there are no plans to create one for the current version of Perl. There has been only one implementation of the interpreter, and the language has evolved along with it. That interpreter, together with its functional tests, stands as a de facto specification of the language. Perl 6, however, started with a specification, and several projects aim to implement some or all of the specification.

Perl is implemented as a core interpreter, written in C, together with a large collection of modules, written in Perl and C. As of 2010, the interpreter is 150,000 lines of C code and compiles to a 1 MB executable on typical machine architectures. Alternatively, the interpreter can be compiled to a link library and embedded in other programs. There are nearly 500 modules in the distribution, comprising 200,000 lines of Perl and an additional 350,000 lines of C code (much of the C code in the modules consists of character encoding tables).

The interpreter has an object-oriented architecture. All of the elements of the Perl language—scalars, arrays, hashes, coderefs, file handles—are represented in the interpreter by C structs. Operations on these structs are defined by a large collection of macros, typedefs, and functions; these constitute the Perl C API. The Perl API can be bewildering to the uninitiated, but its entry points follow a consistent naming scheme, which provides guidance to those who use it.

The life of a Perl interpreter divides broadly into a compile phase and a run phase. According to Aluín et al., "Perl cannot be parsed by a straight Lex/Yacc lexer/parser combination. Instead, the interpreter implements its own lexer, which coordinates with a modified GNU bison parser to resolve ambiguities in the language."

Most of what happens in Perl's compile phase is compilation, and most of what happens in Perl's run phase is execution, but there are significant exceptions. Perl makes important use of its capability to execute Perl code during the compile phase. Perl will also delay compilation into the run phase. The terms that indicate the kind of processing that is actually occurring at any moment are compile time and run time. Perl is in compile time at most points during the compile phase, but compile time may also be entered during the run phase. The compile time for code in a string argument passed to the eval built-in occurs during the run phase. Perl is often in run time during the compile phase and spends most of the run phase in run time. Code in BEGIN blocks executes at run time but in the compile phase.

At compile time, the interpreter parses Perl code into a syntax tree. At run time, it executes the program by walking the tree. Text is parsed only once, and the syntax tree is subject to optimization before it is executed, so that execution is relatively efficient. Compile-time optimizations on the syntax tree include constant folding and context propagation, but peephole optimization is also performed.

Perl has a Turing-complete grammar because parsing can be affected by run-time code executed during the compile phase. The code cannot be parsed by a straight Lex/Yacc lexer/parser. To resolve ambiguities in the language the interpreter must implement its own lexer to coordinate with a modified GNU bison parser.

It is often said that "Only perl can parse Perl", meaning that only the Perl interpreter (perl) can parse the Perl language (Perl), but even this is not, in general, true. Because the Perl interpreter can simulate a Turing machine during its compile phase, it would need to decide the halting problem in order to complete parsing in every case. It is a longstanding result that the halting problem is undecidable, and therefore not even Perl can always parse Perl. Perl makes the unusual choice of giving the user access to its full programming power in its own compile phase. The cost in terms of theoretical purity is high, but practical inconvenience seems to be rare.

Other programs that undertake to parse Perl, such as source-code analyzers and auto-indenters, have to contend not only with ambiguous syntactic constructs but also with the undecidability of Perl parsing in the general case. Adam Kennedy's PPI project focused on parsing Perl code as a document (retaining its integrity as a document), instead of parsing Perl as executable code (that not even Perl itself can always do). It was Kennedy who first conjectured that "parsing Perl suffers from the 'halting problem'," which was later proved.

Perl is distributed with over 250,000 functional tests for core Perl language and over 250,000 functional tests for core modules. These run as part of the normal build process and extensively exercise the interpreter and its core modules. Perl developers rely on the functional tests to ensure that changes to the interpreter do not introduce software bugs; further, Perl users who see that the interpreter passes its functional tests on their system can have a high degree of confidence that it is working properly.

== Ports ==
Perl is dual licensed under both the Artistic License 1.0 and the GNU General Public License. Distributions are available for most operating systems. It is particularly prevalent on Unix and Unix-like systems, but it has been ported to most modern (and many obsolete) platforms. Perl can be compiled from source code on most POSIX-compliant platforms. Because of unusual changes required for the classic Mac OS environment, a special port called MacPerl was shipped independently.

The Comprehensive Perl Archive Network carries a complete list of supported platforms with links to the distributions available on each. CPAN is also the source for publicly available Perl modules that are not part of the core Perl distribution.

ActivePerl is a closed-source distribution from ActiveState that has regular releases that track the core Perl releases. The distribution previously included the Perl package manager (PPM), a popular tool for installing, removing, upgrading, and managing the use of common Perl modules; however, this tool was discontinued as of ActivePerl 5.28. Included also is PerlScript, a Windows Script Host (WSH) engine implementing the Perl language. Visual Perl is an ActiveState tool that adds Perl to the Visual Studio .NET development suite. A VBScript-to-Perl converter, a Perl compiler for Windows, and converters of AWK and sed to Perl have also been produced by this company and included on the ActiveState CD for Windows, which includes all of their distributions plus the Komodo IDE and all but the first on the Unix–Linux–POSIX variant thereof in 2002 and afterward.

== Performance ==
The Computer Language Benchmarks Game compares the performance of implementations of typical programming problems in several programming languages. The submitted Perl implementations typically perform toward the high end of the memory-usage spectrum and give varied speed results. Perl's performance in the benchmarks game is typical for interpreted languages.

Large Perl programs start more slowly than similar programs in compiled languages because Perl has to compile the source every time it runs. In a talk at the YAPC::Europe 2005 conference and subsequent article "A Timely Start", Jean-Louis Leroy found that his Perl programs took much longer to run than expected because the perl interpreter spent significant time finding modules within his over-large include path. Unlike Java, Python, and Ruby, Perl has only experimental support for pre-compiling. Therefore, Perl programs pay this overhead penalty on every execution. The run phase of typical programs is long enough that amortized startup time is not substantial, but benchmarks that measure very short execution times are likely to be skewed due to this overhead.

A number of tools have been introduced to improve this situation. The first such tool was Apache's mod_perl, which sought to address one of the most-common reasons that small Perl programs were invoked rapidly: CGI Web development. ActivePerl, via Microsoft ISAPI, provides similar performance improvements.

Once Perl code is compiled, there is additional overhead during the execution phase that typically isn't present for programs written in compiled languages such as C or C++. Examples of such overhead include bytecode interpretation, reference-counting memory management, and dynamic type-checking.

The most critical routines can be written in other languages (such as C), which can be connected to Perl via simple Inline modules or the more complex, but flexible, XS mechanism.

== Applications ==
Perl has chiefly been used to write CGI scripts: large projects written in Perl include cPanel, Slash, Bugzilla, RT, TWiki, and Movable Type, and high-traffic websites that use Perl extensively include Priceline.com, Craigslist, IMDb, LiveJournal, DuckDuckGo, Slashdot and Ticketmaster. It is also an optional component of the popular LAMP technology stack for Web development, in lieu of PHP or Python. Perl is used extensively as a system programming language in the Debian Linux distribution.

Perl is often used as a glue language, tying together systems and interfaces that were not specifically designed to interoperate, and for "data munging", that is, converting or processing large amounts of data for tasks such as creating reports. These strengths are linked intimately. The combination makes Perl a popular all-purpose language for system administrators, particularly because short programs, often called "one-liner programs", can be entered and run on a single command line.

Perl code can be made portable across Windows and Unix; such code is often used by suppliers of software (both commercial off-the-shelf (COTS) and bespoke) to simplify packaging and maintenance of software build- and deployment-scripts.

Perl/Tk and wxPerl are commonly used to add graphical user interfaces to Perl scripts.

Perl's text-handling capabilities can be used for generating SQL queries; arrays, hashes, and automatic memory management make it easy to collect and process the returned data. For example, in Tim Bunce's Perl DBI application programming interface (API), the arguments to the API can be the text of SQL queries; thus it is possible to program in multiple languages at the same time (e.g., for generating a Web page using HTML, JavaScript, and SQL in a here document). The use of Perl variable interpolation to programmatically customize each of the SQL queries, and the specification of Perl arrays or hashes as the structures to programmatically hold the resulting data sets from each SQL query, allows a high-level mechanism for handling large amounts of data for post-processing by a Perl subprogram. In early versions of Perl, database interfaces were created by relinking the interpreter with a client-side database library. This was sufficiently difficult that it was done for only a few of the most-important and most widely used databases, and it restricted the resulting perl executable to using just one database interface at a time.

In Perl 5, database interfaces are implemented by Perl DBI modules. The DBI (Database Interface) module presents a single, database-independent interface to Perl applications, while the DBD (Database Driver) modules handle the details of accessing some 50 different databases; there are DBD drivers for most ANSI SQL databases.

DBI provides caching for database handles and queries, which can greatly improve performance in long-lived execution environments such as mod_perl, helping high-volume systems avert load spikes as in the Slashdot effect.

In modern Perl applications, especially those written using web frameworks such as Catalyst, the DBI module is often used indirectly via object–relational mappers such as DBIx::Class, Class::DBI or Rose::DB::Object that generate SQL queries and handle data transparently to the application author.

== Community ==
Perl's culture and community has developed alongside the language itself. Usenet was the first public venue in which Perl was introduced, but over the course of its evolution, Perl's community was shaped by the growth of broadening Internet-based services including the introduction of the World Wide Web. The community that surrounds Perl was, in fact, the topic of Wall's first "State of the Onion" talk.

State of the Onion is the name for Wall's yearly keynote-style summaries on the progress of Perl and its community. They are characterized by his hallmark humor, employing references to Perl's culture, the wider hacker culture, Wall's linguistic background, sometimes his family life, and occasionally even his Christian background. Each talk is first given at various Perl conferences and is eventually also published online.

In email, Usenet, and message board postings, "Just another Perl hacker" (JAPH) programs are a common trend, originated by Randal L. Schwartz, one of the earliest professional Perl trainers. In the parlance of Perl culture, Perl programmers are known as Perl hackers, and from this derives the practice of writing short programs to print out the phrase "Just another Perl hacker, [sic]". In the spirit of the original concept, these programs are moderately obfuscated and short enough to fit into the signature of an email or Usenet message. The "canonical" JAPH as developed by Schwartz includes the comma at the end, although this is often omitted.

Perl "golf" is the pastime of reducing the number of characters (key "strokes") used in a Perl program to the bare minimum, much in the same way that golf players seek to take as few shots as possible in a round. The phrase's first use emphasized the difference between pedestrian code meant to teach a newcomer and terse hacks likely to amuse experienced Perl programmers, an example of the latter being JAPHs that were already used in signatures in Usenet postings and elsewhere. Similar stunts had been an unnamed pastime in the language APL in previous decades. The use of Perl to write a program that performed RSA encryption prompted a widespread and practical interest in this pastime. In subsequent years, the term "code golf" has been applied to the pastime in other languages. A Perl Golf Apocalypse was held at Perl Conference 4.0 in Monterey, California in July 2000.

As with C, obfuscated code competitions were a well known pastime in the late 1990s. The Obfuscated Perl Contest was a competition held by The Perl Journal from 1996 to 2000 that made an arch virtue of Perl's syntactic flexibility. Awards were given for categories such as "most powerful"—programs that made efficient use of space—and "best four-line signature" for programs that fit into four lines of 76 characters in the style of a Usenet signature block.

Perl poetry is the practice of writing poems that can be compiled as legal Perl code, for example the piece known as "Black Perl". Perl poetry is made possible by the large number of English words that are used in the Perl language. New poems are regularly submitted to the community at PerlMonks.

=== Yet Another Perl Conference ===
Yet Another Perl Conference (also called YAPC), from 2016–2019 called The Perl Conference (TPC), from 2020 on The Perl and Raku Conference, is a series of conferences discussing the Perl programming language, that has run since 1999. It is usually organized under the auspices of The Perl Foundation and Yet Another Society, a "non-profit corporation for the advancement of collaborative efforts in computer and information sciences".

==== History ====
The first YAPC was held at Carnegie Mellon University in Pittsburgh, Pennsylvania, US on June 24 and June 25, 1999, organized by Kevin Lenzo. YAPC's origins were in the not-for-profit Perl Mongers user group. The first conference assembled 31 different speakers into the schedule on various Perl-related topics.

The idea of a low-cost Perl conference quickly spread. The first European version of YAPC was organized by members of the Perl Mongers in London in 2000, Israel in 2003, Australia in 2004, Asia and Brazil in 2005, and Russia in 2008. The only continents never to have hosted a YAPC are Africa and Antarctica.

In 2016, YAPC rebranded itself as The Perl Conference, which is the former name of O'Reilly Open Source Convention (OSCON). As of 2020, it is now calling itself The Perl and Raku Conference to reflect the renaming of Perl 6 to Raku.

==== Reception ====
By 2002, The Perl Developer's Dictionary listed YAPC as the second-most important conference in the Perl scene, after O'Reilly's Open Source Conference. Minimal Perl describes YAPC as "a collection of low-priced grassroots events held around the world for the benefit of those who either can’t afford the expense of the more elaborately staged conferences or just prefer the company of students and geeks to corporate IT types." The conference is recommended in various other books about Perl programming from the 2000s.

The Dutch Linux Magazine reviewed the second European YAPC conference, held in Amsterdam in 2001, and describes the consternation when organisers revealed they had been listening in on network traffic and had found that several participants used unencrypted passwords, despite the conference theme being security. Other topics that year included building user interfaces, using Perl for speech, and parallel programming, and the conference had three parallel sessions with around 250 participants.

The name is an homage to yacc, "Yet Another Compiler Compiler".

==== Locations ====
===== North America =====
- 1999: Pittsburgh, Pennsylvania, USA (June 24–25, 1999) YAPC::NA 1999
- 2000: Pittsburgh, Pennsylvania, USA (June 21–23, 2000) YAPC::NA 19100
- 2001: Montréal, Québec, Canada (June 13–15, 2001) YAPC::NA 2001
- 2002: Saint Louis, Missouri, USA (June 26–28, 2002) YAPC::NA 2002
- 2003: Canada: Ottawa, Ontario, Canada (May 15–16, 2003) (held as YAPC::Canada) YAPC::Canada
- 2003: America: Boca Raton, Florida, USA (June 16–18, 2003) YAPC::NA 2003
- 2004: Buffalo, New York, USA (June 16–18, 2004) YAPC::NA 2004
- 2005: Toronto, Ontario, Canada (June 27–29, 2005) YAPC::NA 2005
- 2006: Chicago, Illinois, USA (June 26–30, 2006) 2006) YAPC::NA 2006
- 2007: Houston, Texas, USA (June 25–27, 2007) YAPC::NA 2007
- 2008: Chicago, Illinois, USA (June 16–18, 2008) YAPC::NA 2008
- 2009: Pittsburgh, Pennsylvania, USA (June 22–24, 2009) YAPC::NA 2009
- 2010: Columbus, Ohio, USA (June 21–23, 2010) YAPC::NA 2010
- 2011: Asheville, North Carolina, USA (June 27–30, 2011) YAPC::NA 2011
- 2012: Madison, Wisconsin, USA (June 13–15, 2012) YAPC::NA 2012
- 2013: Austin, Texas, USA (June 3–5, 2013) YAPC::NA 2013
- 2014: Orlando, Florida, USA (June 23–25, 2014) YAPC::NA 2014
- 2015: Salt Lake City, Utah, USA (June 8–10, 2015) YAPC::NA 2015
- 2016: Orlando, Florida, USA (June 20–22, 2016) YAPC::NA 2016
- 2017: Alexandria, Virginia, USA (June 18–23, 2017) The Perl Conference in DC
- 2018: Salt Lake City, Utah, USA (June 17–22, 2018) The Perl Conference in Salt Lake City
- 2019: Pittsburgh, Pennsylvania, USA (June 16–21, 2019) The Perl Conference in Pittsburgh
- 2020: Online (due to COVID-19) (Wednesday 24th to Friday 26th 2020) Perl and Raku 'Conference in the Cloud'
  - Replaces TPCiH 2020 Houston Tuesday, planned June 23 through Saturday, June 27th
- 2021 Conference in the Cloud (June 8–10, 2021) The Perl and Raku Conference in the Cloud
- 2022: Houston, TX (June 22–24, 2022) TPCiH 2022 Houston
- 2023: Toronto, CA (July 11–13, 2023) The Perl and Raku Conference in Toronto
- 2024: Las Vegas, NV (June 24–28, 2024) TPRC Las Vegas, NV
- 2025: Greenville, SC (June 27–29, 2025) TPRC Greenville, SC

===== Europe =====
- 2000: London, England (September 22–24, 2000) YAPC::EU 2000
- 2001: Amsterdam, Netherlands (August 2–4, 2001) YAPC::EU 2001
- 2002: Munich, Germany (September 18–20, 2002) YAPC::EU 2002
- 2003: Paris, France (July 23–25, 2003) YAPC::EU 2003
- 2004: Belfast, Northern Ireland (September 15–17, 2004) YAPC::EU 2004
- 2005: Braga, Portugal (August 31 – September 2, 2005) YAPC::EU 2005 Perl Everywhere
- 2006: Birmingham, England (August 30 – September 1, 2006) YAPC::EU 2006
- 2007: Vienna, Austria (August 28–30, 2007) YAPC::EU 2007 Social Perl
- 2008: Copenhagen, Denmark (August 13–15, 2008) YAPC::EU 2008 Beautiful Perl
- 2009: Lisbon, Portugal (August 3–5, 2009) YAPC::EU 2009 Corporate Perl
- 2010: Pisa, Italy (August 4–6, 2010) YAPC::EU 2010 The Renaissance of Perl
- 2011: Riga, Latvia (August 15–17, 2011) YAPC::EU 2011 Modern Perl
- 2012: Frankfurt, Germany (August 20–22, 2012) YAPC::EU 2012
- 2013: Kyiv, Ukraine (August 12–14, 2013) YAPC::EU 2013 Future Perl
- 2014: Sofia, Bulgaria (August 22–24, 2014) YAPC::EU 2014
- 2015: Granada, Spain (September 2–4, 2015) YAPC::EU 2015 Art+Engineering
- 2016: Cluj-Napoca, Romania (August 24–26, 2016) YAPC::Europe 2016
- 2017: Amsterdam, the Netherlands (August 9–11, 2017) The Perl Conference in Amsterdam
- 2018: Glasgow (August 13–17, 2018) The Perl Conference in Glasgow
- 2019: Riga (August 7–9, 2019) PerlCon
- 2020: Amsterdam (August 10–14, 2020) Perl & Raku Con in Amsterdam – cancelled due to the Coronavirus pandemic
- 2023: Helsinki (August 14–18, 2023) Perl & Koha Conference in Helsinki

===== Israel =====
- 2003: Haifa (May 11, 2003) YAPC::Israel::2003
- 2004: Herzliya (February 26, 2004) YAPC::Israel::2004
- 2005: Herzliya (February 17, 2005) YAPC::Israel::2005
- 2006: Netanya. In 2006, YAPC::Israel became OSDC::Israel. OSDC::Israel 2006

===== Russia & Ukraine =====
- 2008: Moscow, Russia (May 17–18, 2008) YAPC::Russia 2008 May Perl
- 2009: Moscow, Russia (May 16–17, 2009) YAPC::Russia 2009 May Perl 2
- 2010: Kyiv, Ukraine (June 12–14, 2010) YAPC::Russia 2010 May Perl + Perl Mova
- 2011: Moscow, Russia (May 14–15, 2011) YAPC::Russia 2011 May Perl + Perl Mova
- 2012: Kyiv, Ukraine (May 12–13, 2012) YAPC::Russia May Perl
- no event held in 2013, due to YAPC::Europe 2013 taking place in Kyiv
- 2014: St. Petersburg, Russia (June 13–14, 2014) YAPC::Russia 2014
- 2015: Moscow, Russia (May 16–17, 2015) YAPC::Russia 2015
- 2017: Moscow, Russia (November 4, 2016) YAPC::Russia 2017

===== Australia =====
- The first YAPC::Australia was held as part of the 2004 OSDC in Melbourne from December 1-December 5, 2004, and has been held jointly thereafter.

===== South America =====
These events are held in conjunction with CONISLI.

- 2006: Porto Alegre/RS (April 19–22, 2006) YAPC::SA::2006
- 2007: Porto Alegre/RS (April 11–14, 2007) YAPC::SA::2007
- 2008: Porto Alegre/RS (April 17–19, 2008) YAPC::SA::2008
- 2009: Porto Alegre/RS (June 24–27, 2009) YAPC::SA::2009

====== Brazil ======
- 2005: Porto Alegre/RS (June 1–5, 2005) YAPC::Brasil 2005
- 2006: São Paulo/SP, Brazil (November 3–5, 2006) YAPC::Brasil 2006
- 2007: São Paulo/SP, Brazil (November 9–11, 2007) YAPC::Brasil 2007
- 2008: São Paulo/SP, Brazil (October 18–19, 2008) YAPC::Brasil 2008
- 2009: Niterói/RJ, Brazil (October 30 – November 1, 2009) YAPC::Brasil 2009
- 2010: Fortaleza/CE, Brazil (October 25–31, 2010) YAPC::Brasil 2010 Perl: Solução e Integração de Negócios
- 2011: Rio de Janeiro/RJ, Brazil (November 4–6, 2011) YAPC::Brasil 2011
- 2012: São Paulo/SP, Brazil (October 19–20, 2012) YAPC::Brasil 2012 A revolução dos dados
- 2013: Curitiba/PR, Brazil (November 15–16, 2013) YAPC::Brasil 2013 Universo Científico e Perl Hacking
- 2014: Itapema/SC, Brazil (September 19–20, 2014) YAPC::Brasil 2014 Soluções Tecnológicas para Gestão Pública
- 2015: Taubaté/SP, Brazil (September 18–20, 2015) YAPC::Brasil 2015 Perl Community and CPAN

===== Asia =====
- 2004: Taipei, Taiwan (March 27–28, 2004) YAPC::2004::Taipei
- 2005: Taipei, Taiwan (March 26–27, 2005) (held as YAPC::Taipei) YAPC::2005::Taipei
- 2006: Tokyo, Japan (March 29–30, 2006) YAPC::Asia 2006
- 2007: Tokyo, Japan (April 4–5, 2007) YAPC::Asia 2007
- 2008: Tokyo, Japan (May 15–16, 2008) YAPC::Asia 2008
- 2009: Tokyo, Japan (September 10–11, 2009) YAPC::Asia 2009
- 2010: Tokyo, Japan (October 15–16, 2010) YAPC::Asia 2010
- 2011: Tokyo, Japan (October 14–15, 2011) YAPC::Asia 2011
- 2012: Tokyo, Japan (September 27–29, 2012) YAPC::Asia 2012
- 2013: Tokyo, Japan (September 19–21, 2013) YAPC::Asia 2013
- 2014: Tokyo, Japan (August 28–30, 2014) YAPC::Asia 2014
- 2015: Tokyo, Japan (August 20–22, 2015) YAPC::Asia 2015
- 2016: Hokkaido, Japan (9–10 December 2016) YAPC::Hokkaido
- 2017: Kansai (3–4 March 2017) YAPC::Kansai 2017
- 2017: Fukuoka (30 June – 1 July) YAPC::Fukuoka 2017
- 2018: Okinawa (2–3 March 2018)YAPC::Okinawa 2018
- 2019: Tokyo, Japan (25–26 January 2019) YAPC::Tokyo 2019
- 2020: Kyoto, Japan (March 27–28, 2020) YAPC::Kyoto 2020
- 2021: Online, YAPC::Japan (February 18–19, 2021) YAPC::Japan 2021
- 2022: Online, YAPC::Japan (March 4–5, 2022) YAPC::Japan 2022
- 2022: Kyoto, Japan (March 19, 2023) YAPC::Kyoto 2023
- 2024: Hiroshima, Japan (February 10, 2024) YAPC::Hiroshima 2024
- 2024: Hakodate, Japan (October 5, 2024) YAPC::Hakodate 2024
- 2025: Fukuoka, Japan (November 14–15, 2025) YAPC::Fukuoka 2025

== See also ==
- List of Perl programming books
- List of Perl software and tools
- Outline of Perl
- Perl Data Language
- Perl Object Environment
- Plain Old Documentation
