= O'Reilly Open Source Convention =

1999–2019 American annual free and open-source software convention

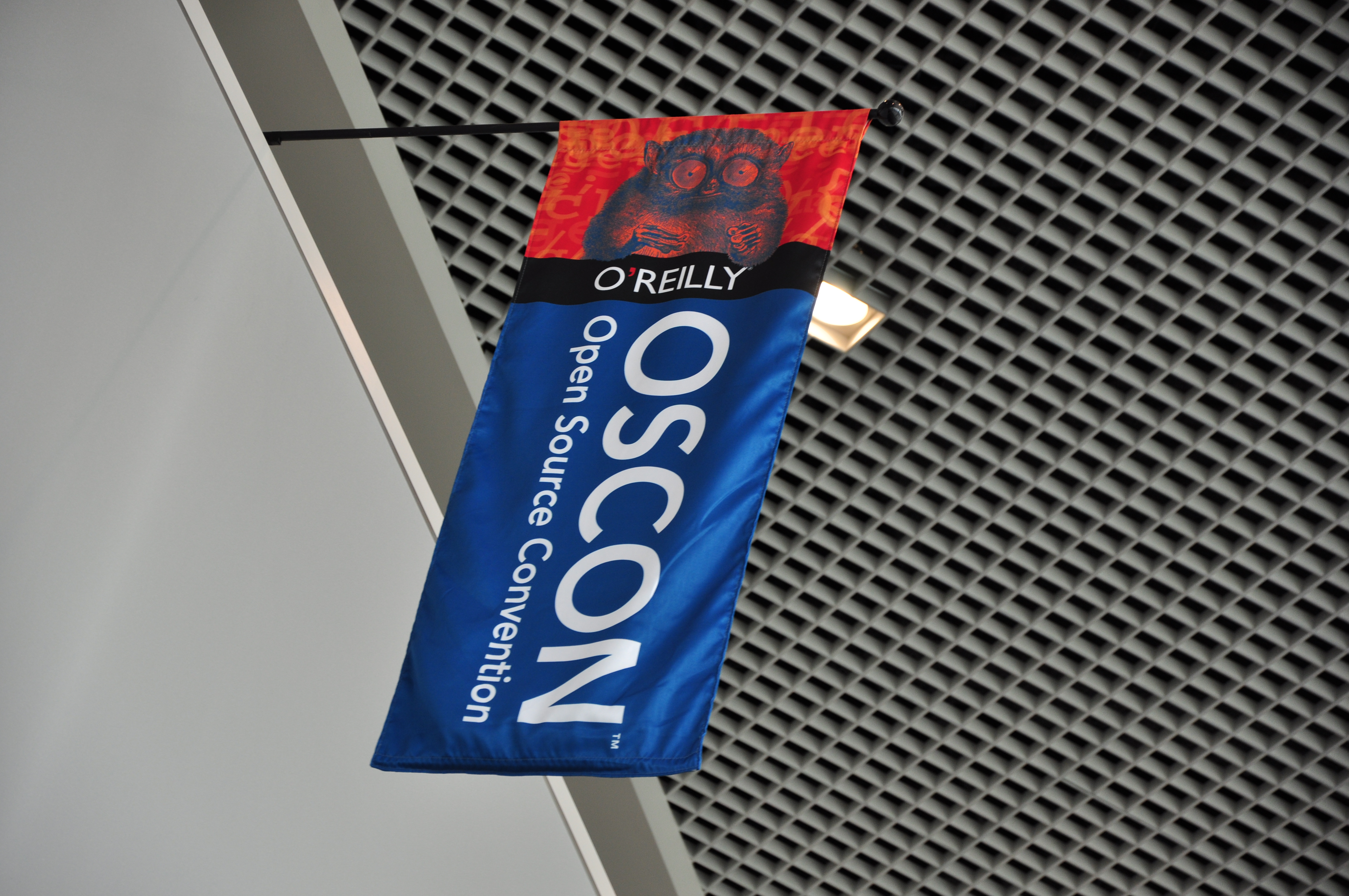
- OSCON flag
- Status: Inactive
- Genre: Open Source (mainly software)
- Locations: Portland, Oregon (with exceptions)
- Country: United States
- Inaugurated: 1999; 27 years ago
- Most recent: 2019; 7 years ago
- Organizer: O'Reilly Media
- Website: www.oscon.com

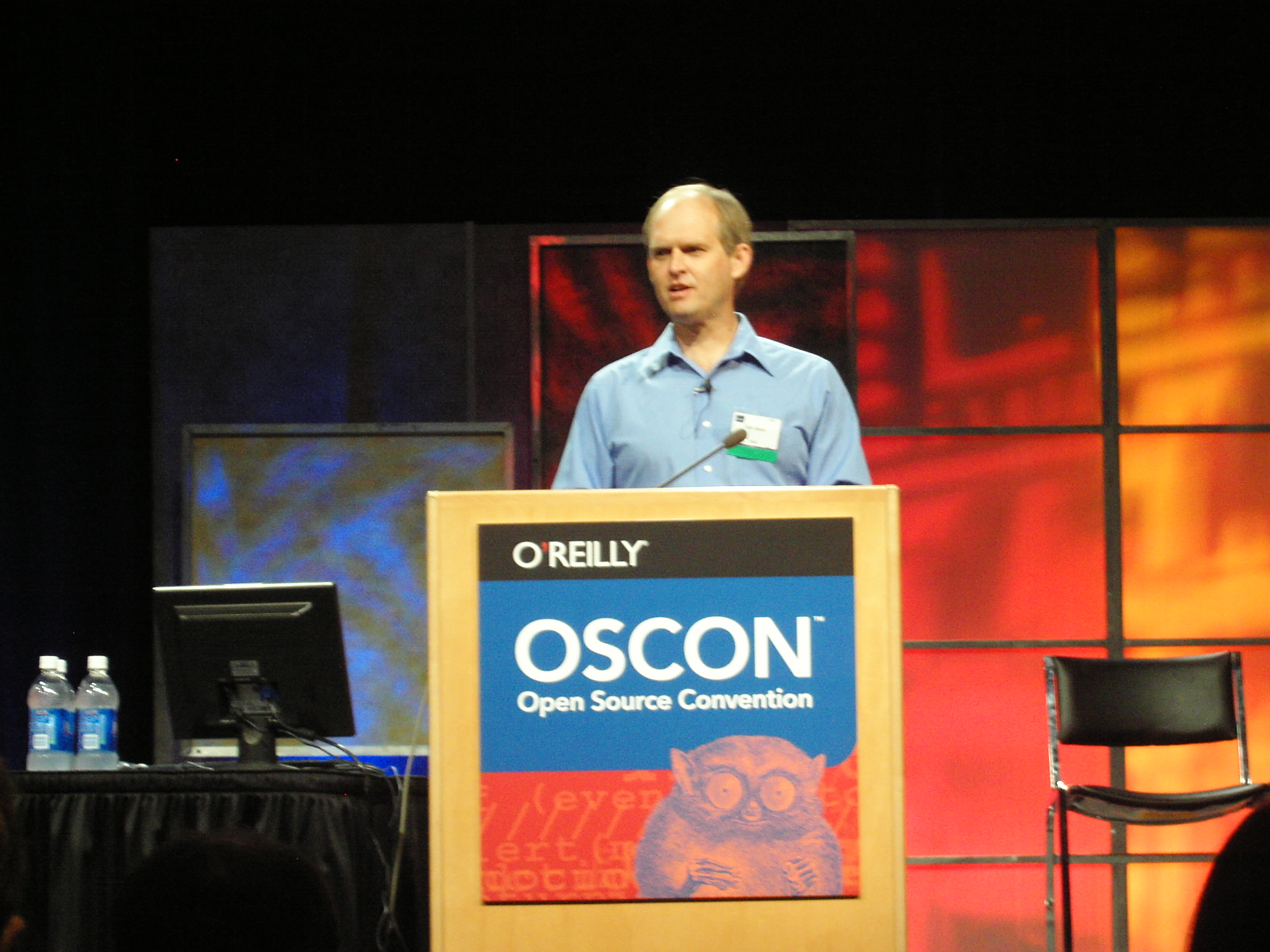
Robin Hanson at OSCON 2007

Overview of OSCON 2009

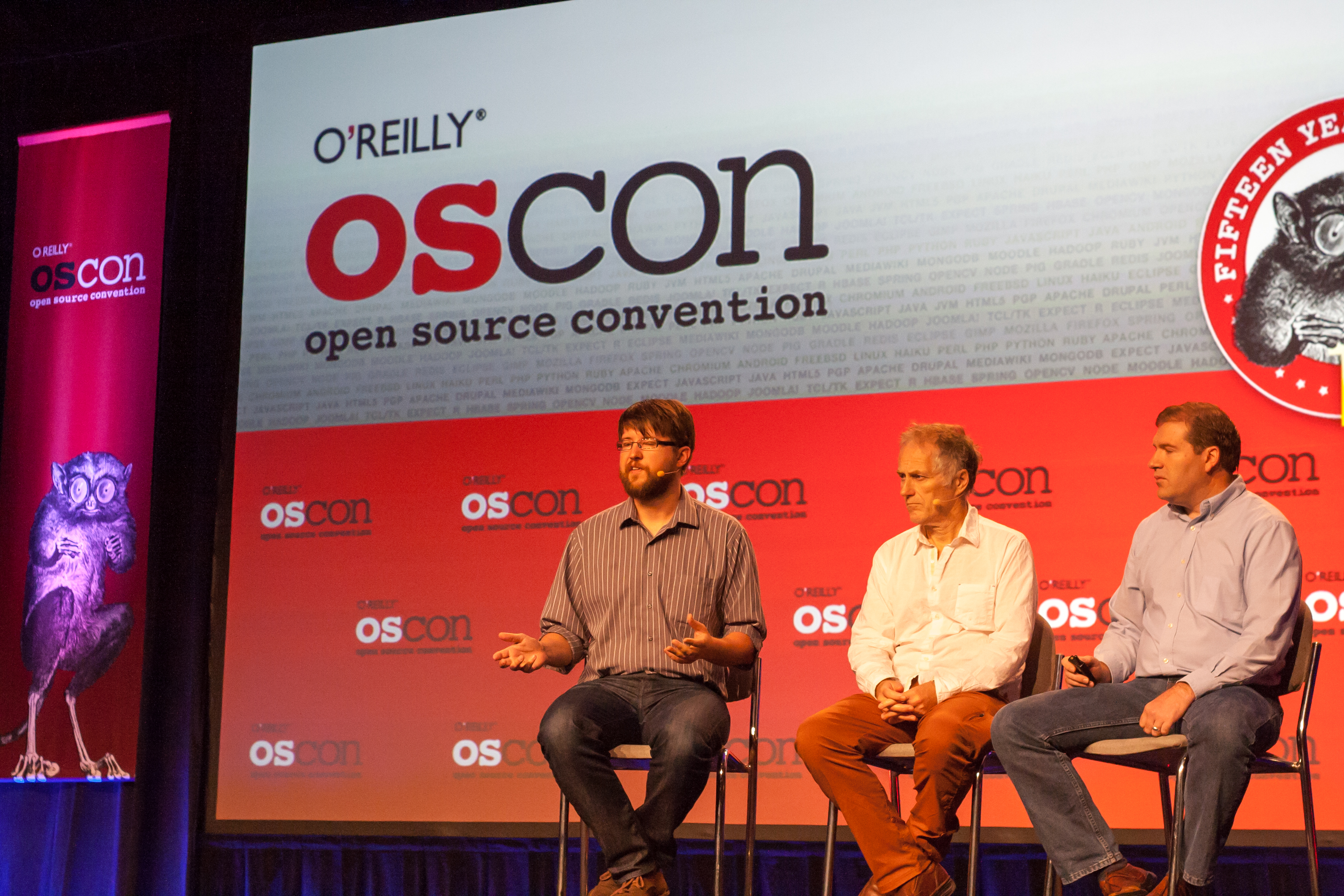
Michal Migurski, Tim O'Reilly, and Jared Smith at OSCON 2013

The O'Reilly Open Source Convention (OSCON) was an American annual convention for the discussion of free and open-source software. It was organized by publisher O'Reilly Media and was held each summer, mostly in Portland, Oregon, from 1999 to 2019.

== History ==
OSCON grew out of The Perl Conference, but the amount of Perl content continued to decline each year. The first Perl Conference took place in 1997. The first OSCON was held in 1999.

Notable events

- The OpenOffice.org open source project was announced at the 2000 conference in Monterey.
- The OpenStack open source project was launched at the 2010 conference.
- OSCON has been the host to Larry Wall's State of the Onion keynotes.
- All O'Reilly events were cancelled in response to the COVID-19 pandemic, and the company closed the in-person conference portion of their business.
- During the convention, O'Reilly Open Source Awards, previously called Google-O'Reilly Open Source Awards, were presented to individuals who had made notable contributions to open source.

== See also ==
- List of free-software events
