= Artistic License =

Series of free software licenses

- Author: The Perl Foundation
- Latest version: 2.0
- Publisher: The Perl Foundation
- Published: ?
- SPDX identifier: Artistic-1.0; Artistic-1.0-cl8; Artistic-1.0-Perl; Artistic-2.0; ClArtistic
- Debian FSG compatible: Yes
- FSF approved: 1.0 No (Yes, for Clarified Artistic License), 2.0 Yes
- OSI approved: Yes (both)
- GPL compatible: 1.0 No (Yes, for Clarified Artistic License), 2.0 Yes
- Copyleft: No
- Linking from code with a different license: Yes
- Website: www.perlfoundation.org/artistic-license-20.html

The Artistic License is an open-source license used for certain free and open-source software packages, most notably the standard implementation of the Perl programming language and most CPAN modules, which are dual-licensed under the Artistic License and the GNU General Public License (GPL).

== History ==
=== Artistic License 1.0 ===
The original Artistic License was written by Larry Wall. The name of the license is a reference to the concept of artistic license.

Whether or not the original Artistic License is a free software license is largely unsettled. The Free Software Foundation explicitly called the original Artistic License a non-free license, criticizing it as being "too vague; some passages are too clever for their own good, and their meaning is not clear". The FSF recommended that the license not be used on its own, but approved the common AL/GPL dual-licensing approach for Perl projects.

In response to this, Bradley Kuhn, who later worked for the Free Software Foundation, made a minimal redraft to clarify the ambiguous passages. This was released as the Clarified Artistic License and was approved by the FSF. It is used by the Paros Proxy, the JavaFBP toolkit and NcFTP.

The terms of the Artistic License 1.0 were at issue in Jacobsen v. Katzer in the initial 2009 ruling by the United States District Court for the Northern District of California declared that FOSS-like licenses could only be enforced through contract law rather than through copyright law, in contexts where contract damages would be difficult to establish. On appeal, a federal appellate court "determined that the terms of the Artistic License are enforceable copyright conditions". The case was remanded to the District Court, which did not apply the superior court's criteria on the grounds that, in the interim, the governing Supreme Court precedent applicable to the case had changed. However, this left undisturbed the finding that a free and open-source license nonetheless has economic value. Jacobsen ultimately prevailed in 2010, and the Case established a new standard making terms and conditions under Artistic License 1.0 enforceable through copyright statutes and relevant precedents.

=== Artistic License 2.0 ===
In response to the Request for Comments (RFC) process for improving the licensing position for Raku, Kuhn's draft was extensively rewritten by Roberta Cairney and Allison Randal for readability and legal clarity, with input from the Perl community. This resulted in the Artistic License 2.0, which has been approved as both a free software and open source license.

The Artistic license 2.0 is also notable for its excellent license compatibility with other FOSS licenses due to a relicensing clause, a property other licenses like the GPL lack.

You may Distribute your Modified Version as Source (either gratis or for a Distributor Fee, and with or without a Compiled form of the Modified Version) [...] provided that you do at least ONE of the following:

[...] (c) allow anyone who receives a copy of the Modified Version to make the Source form of the Modified Version available to others under

(i) the Original License or

(ii) a license that permits the licensee to freely copy, modify and redistribute the Modified Version using the same licensing terms that apply to the copy that the licensee received, and requires that the Source form of the Modified Version, and of any works derived from it, be made freely available in that license fees are prohibited but Distributor Fees are allowed.

The OSI recommends that all developers and projects licensing their products with the Artistic License adopt Artistic License 2.0.
