= List of Perl software and tools =

This is a list of software and programming tools for the Perl programming language, which includes Perl modules, debuggers, compilers, integrated development environments, build automation, and related projects.

== Modules and tools ==
- ActivePerl — commercial and free Perl distribution from ActiveState
- Amavis — content filter for email
- Anti-Spam SMTP Proxy — open-source transparent SMTP proxy server
- AWStats — Web analytics reporting tool
- AxKit — XML Apache publishing framework
- BackupPC — backup software for servers and workstations
- Big Medium — content management system
- Bricolage — content management system
- Catalyst — Model–view–controller web framework
- CGI.pm — module for writing CGI web applications
- CPAN — Perl module software repository
- Dancer — lightweight web framework, inspired by Ruby's Sinatra.
- Fink — port and package open-source Unix programs to macOS
- Foswiki — enterprise wiki, typically used to run a collaboration platform, knowledge base or document management system
- Gtk2-Perl — Perl bindings for the GTK graphical user interface toolkit
- Ikonboard — forum software
- Infobot — IRC bot and chatbot framework
- Koha — open-source library management system
- Library for WWW in Perl — set of modules for web access and manipulation
- Lyrion Music Server — music server software
- Majordomo — mailing list manager
- MARC — library data archive format
- Matt's Script Archive — collection of Perl scripts
- Mojolicious — real-time web framework
- Moose — postmodern object system
- Movable Type — blogging platform
- NTP pool — network time protocol management service
- OTRS — ticketing and help desk system
- Parrot VM — virtual machine designed for dynamic languages
- Perl Archive Toolkit — packaging and deployment tool for computer applications and libraries
- Perl Object Environment — object-oriented framework
- Perl package manager – package manager
- Perlbal — reverse proxy, load balancer, and web server.
- Plack — Perl web application toolkit
- Proxmox Virtual Environment — virtualization management platform
- Perl Web Server Gateway Interface (PSGI) – interface between web servers and web applications and frameworks
- Qpsmtpd — Simple Mail Transfer Protocol daemon
- Request Tracker — issue tracking system
- Slash — collaborative publishing platform
- Sprog — RSS aggregator
- SQL-Ledger — accounting system
- Strawberry Perl — Perl distribution for Windows
- Template Toolkit — template processing system
- TWiki — structured wiki and collaboration platform
- VERTCON — computes the modeled difference in orthometric height
- W3Perl — web server log analyzer
- WebGUI — content management system

== Integrated development environments ==
- Padre
- Komodo IDE
- Eclipse
- Visual Studio Code
- Atom
- Geany
- NetBeans

=== Online IDEs ===
- GitHub Codespaces
- Replit
- JDoodle

== Compilers ==
- B::C compiler — takes Perl source and generates C source code
- B::CC compiler
- B::Bytecode compiler — compiles a Perl script into a bytecode format that could be loaded later by the ByteLoader module
- perlcompile — modules for compiling Perl scripts into executables
- PAR::Packer — package Perl applications into standalone executables

== Build and automation tools ==
- Dist::Zilla — distribution builder
- Module::Build — tool for building, testing, and installing Perl modules.
- ExtUtils::MakeMaker — traditional Perl module building tool
- Carton — dependency manager for Perl projects

== Debugging tools ==
- Bugzilla — bug tracking system
- Debbugs — bug tracking system
- Devel::Cover — code coverage analysis tool

== Unit testing ==
- Test::Simple — basic testing framework
- Test::More — unit testing module
- Test::Exception — testing exception handling
- Test::Harness — runs Perl tests and summarizes results

== Mathematical libraries ==
- Math::BigInt — arbitrary-size integer library
- Math::BigFloat — arbitrary-precision floating-point library
- Math::Complex — complex number computations
- Math::Matrix — matrix algebra library
- PDL — Perl Data Language for scientific computing and numerical operations
- Statistics::Descriptive — basic statistics module

== Scientific libraries ==
- BioMOBY — bioinformatics web services platform
- BioPerl — bioinformatics

== Machine learning and artificial intelligence ==
- AI::Perceptron — simple neural network implementation
- AI::FANN — Perl bindings for Fast Artificial Neural Network library
- Algorithm-LibLinear-0.26 — support vector machine module
- Perl Data Language — machine learning using k-means clustering

== Databases ==
- DBIx::Class — map relational database table rows to Perl objects and generates SQL queries
- Perl Database Interface (DBI)— embed database communication within programs
- DBD::mysql — MySQL driver for DBI
- DBD::Pg — PostgreSQL driver for DBI
- DBD::SQLite — SQLite driver for DBI

== Static code analysis ==
- Perl::Critic
- PerlTidy
- Padre – IDE for Perl that also provides static code analysis to check for common beginner errors

== List of other open-source applications using Perl ==
- Greymatter — blogging platform
- Movable Type — blogging platform
- WikiWikiWeb — early wiki software

== See also ==
- CPanel — web hosting control panel written in Perl
- List of C software and tools
- List of C++ software and tools
- List of Ruby software and tools
- List of Java frameworks
- List of JavaScript libraries and Comparison of JavaScript-based web frameworks
- List of PHP software and tools
- List of Python software
- List of free software programmed in Perl
- List of Perl programming books
- List of computer programming journals
- Outline of Perl
