= KernelTrap =

- Website type: News
- Available in: English
- Owner: Jeremy Andrews
- Creator: Jeremy Andrews
- Website: kerneltrap.org
- Commercial: No
- Registration: Optional
- Current status: Inactive

KernelTrap was a computing news website which covered topics related to the development of free and open source operating system kernels, and especially, the Linux kernel.

News stories usually consisted of a summary of a recent discussion from a development mailing list (Linux kernel mailing list) followed by the entire contents of several messages from the discussion. Each story had moderated threaded discussion attached to it. The site also included a forum for general discussion of computing topics.

The site used the Drupal content management system. Kerneltrap was hosted by the Oregon State University Open Source Lab from May 2005.

The site was operated by Jeremy Andrews.

== Current status ==
The site has not been active since 12 April 2010, only 12 days after it became active again after a full year without any news items (except a note about upgrading the site engine, Drupal). Since May 2021, the kerneltrap.org domain points to a lengthy KernelTrap-style interview with Linus Torvalds on Jeremy's consulting company website.

== Books ==
KernelTrap has been referenced in several books.

- Linux Kernel Development by Robert Love
- Red Hat Linux 9 Bible by Christopher Negus
- SUSE Linux 10.0 Unleashed by Mike McCallister
- Measuring Information Systems Delivery Quality by Evan W. Duggan and Han Reichgelt

== See also ==
- LWN.net
