= Linux kernel mailing list =

Mailing list for Linux kernel development

- Website type: Information exchange for Linux kernel development
- Website: LKML
- Current status: Online

The Linux kernel mailing list (LKML) is the main electronic mailing list for Linux kernel development, where the majority of the announcements, discussion and debates over the kernel take place. Many other mailing lists exist to discuss the different subsystems and ports of the Linux kernel, but LKML is the principal communication channel among Linux kernel developers. It is a very high-volume list, usually receiving about 1,400 messages each day, most of which are kernel code patches.

Linux utilizes a workflow governed by LKML, which is the "bazaar" where kernel development takes place. In his book Linux Kernel Development, Robert Love notes:

If the Linux kernel community had to exist somewhere physically, it would call the Linux Kernel Mailing List home.

The LKML functions as the central place where Linux developers around the world share patches, argue about implementation details, and discuss other issues. The official releases of the Linux kernel are indicated by an email to LKML. New features are discussed and most code is posted to the list before any action is taken. It is also the official place for reporting bugs in the Linux kernel, in case one cannot find the maintainer to whom the bug should be reported. Author Michelle Delio suggests that it was on LKML that Tux, the official Linux mascot, was suggested and refined, although the accuracy of her reporting in other stories has been disputed. Many companies associated with Linux kernel make announcements and proposals on LKML; for example, Novell, Intel, VMware, and IBM.

The list subscribers include all the Linux kernel maintainers as well as other known figures in Linux circles, such as Jeff V. Merkey and Eric S. Raymond. A 2000 study found that 14,535 people, from at least 30 countries, sent at least one email to LKML between 1995 and 2000 to participate in the discussion of Linux development.

Authors of books such as The Linux Kernel Development As A Model of Open Source Knowledge Creation and Motivation of Software Developers in Open Source Projects, and Recovering Device Drivers have made use of LKML for their research studies and surveys.

== Media coverage ==
The LWN.net website frequently covers discussion on the LKML, and the newsletter Kernel Traffic covered the activities of the LKML until November 2005. Many internet websites include archives of the mailing list, such as lore.kernel.org/lkml, lkml.org, mail-archive.com and marc.info.

== Conduct of Linus Torvalds ==
Linus Torvalds is known for angrily disagreeing with other developers on the LKML. Calling himself a "really unpleasant person", he later explained "I'd like to be a nice person and curse less and encourage people to grow rather than telling them they are idiots. I'm sorry – I tried, it's just not in me."

His attitude, which Torvalds considers necessary for making his point clear, has drawn opposition from Intel programmer Sage Sharp and systemd developer Lennart Poettering, among others. In 2018 Torvalds took a break from kernel development to work on improving his behavior and instituted a code of conduct.

== See also ==
- kernel.org – home site for kernel source code distribution
- LWN.net – among other things, provides a weekly LKML news digest
- KernelTrap – former news website
