= Pisg =

Pisg or PISG may refer to:

- pisg (Software) - Perl IRC Statistics Generator
- Provisional Institutions of Self-Government established in Kosovo by the United Nations in 2003.
