= Sprog =

Sprog may refer to:

- Sprog, son of the fictional character Max Rockatansky (Mad Max)
- Sprog (software), a graphical tool for Perl programs
- SPROG, a Sierra club summer training program for youth
- Sprog, nickname for snooker player Mark Williams

== See also ==
- Sprogg, a character in the TV series Rupert
