= Grey Matter =

Grey matter is a component of the central nervous system.

Grey Matter may also refer to:

== Music ==
- Gray Matter (band)
- Grey Matter (album), by Wool on Wolves
- "Grey Matter", a song by Oingo Boingo on the album Nothing to Fear

== Film and television ==
- Gray Matter (film), a 2023 American science fiction thriller drama film
- Grey Matter (film), a 2011 Rwandan film
- "Gray Matter" (Breaking Bad)
  - Gray Matter Technologies, a fictional company on Breaking Bad
- Grey Matter (Ben 10), a Ben 10 character

== Other uses ==
- Gray Matter (video game)
- "Gray Matter" (short story), by Stephen King
- Gray Matter Studios, defunct American video game developer
- Gray Matter (company), defunct Canadian video game developer
- Greymatter (software), a blogging program
- Grey Matter (entertainer), American drag artist

== See also ==
- Gray Matters (disambiguation)
