= PerlTidy =

Perl static code analysis tool

- Original author(s): Steve Hancock
- Initial release: 2003; 22 years ago
- Stable release: 20160302 / March 2, 2016; 9 years ago
- Written in: Perl
- Operating system: Cross-platform
- Available in: English
- Type: Static code analysis
- License: GNU General Public License
- Website: perltidy.sourceforge.net

PerlTidy is a tool written in the Perl programming language to do static code analysis against code written in that same language. It uses either command-line switches or configuration files to reformat Perl scripts so they comply with specified coding rules. The default configuration is an approximation of the Perl Style Guide.

Aside from the command line, there are a number of tools for alternate interfaces for PerlTidy, including one for the Padre IDE, perltidy.el for Emacs, and an online version.

Since its introduction, PerlTidy has become an oft-recommend tool for Perl programmers, noted in a number of key books. Notably, the work Perl Best Practices provides a set of PerlTidy configurations to match the syntax prescriptions in that book.
