= FormMail =

Formmail and its many variants, is a free open source web server CGI script that captures and processes form contents and then typically e-mails them to one or more recipients.

The script, originally created in Perl, was originally written in early 1993 by Reuven M. Lerner, as part of his work on The Tech, and was included in the archive of CGI programs made available by NCSA HTTPd. In its original form, it was called "form-mail.pl", and was released under the GNU General Public License.

The program was subsequently stripped of its copyright and authorship, renamed "FormMail", and publicized by Matt Wright as part of Matt's Script Archive.

== Operation ==
The script operates by iteratively reading all the form fields from the submitted form via the form ACTION tag. Next the script begins to build an e-mail message from the submitted fields, typically concatenating the name and value of each submitted form field in the body of the email message.

The script uses several specially-named hidden fields to control the operation of the script. The various hidden fields control who the recipient of the e-mail is, what the email subject is set to, etc. Finally the script e-mails the form's contents to the recipient(s).

The typical FormMail script has this common functionality:

- Reads all form fields and creates an e-mail message from them
- Recipient fields (typically hidden) allow creator to determine e-mail recipient
- Subject field, allows the creator to set the Subject of the e-mail in a hidden form field
- Required fields, allows you to set which fields need to be completed to send the e-mail
- CC, BCC fields, allow you to copy and forward to multiple recipients

More advanced variants of the script have additional features such as: provide for e-mail attachments, prevent form spamming, save the e-mail to a file or database, add CAPTCHA validation and more.

Today a variant of the script exists for most popular web scripting languages, such as Perl, ASP (ASP.NET), PHP, ColdFusion, and Java.

== See also ==
- History of the World Wide Web
- Sendmail
