= Gray Matters =

Gray Matters or Grey Matters may refer to:

- Gray Matters (novel), by William Hjortsberg
- Gray Matters (2006 film), a film directed by Sue Kramer
- Gray Matters (2014 film), a documentary film by Marco Orsini
- Gray Matter (2023 film), science fiction film by Meko Winbush
- Gray Matters (record label)
- "Gray Matters" (Johnny Bravo), a 2004 episode of Johnny Bravo
- "Grey Matters" (Fringe)

== See also ==
- Grey Matter (disambiguation)
