= Lincoln Stein =

American bioinformatician

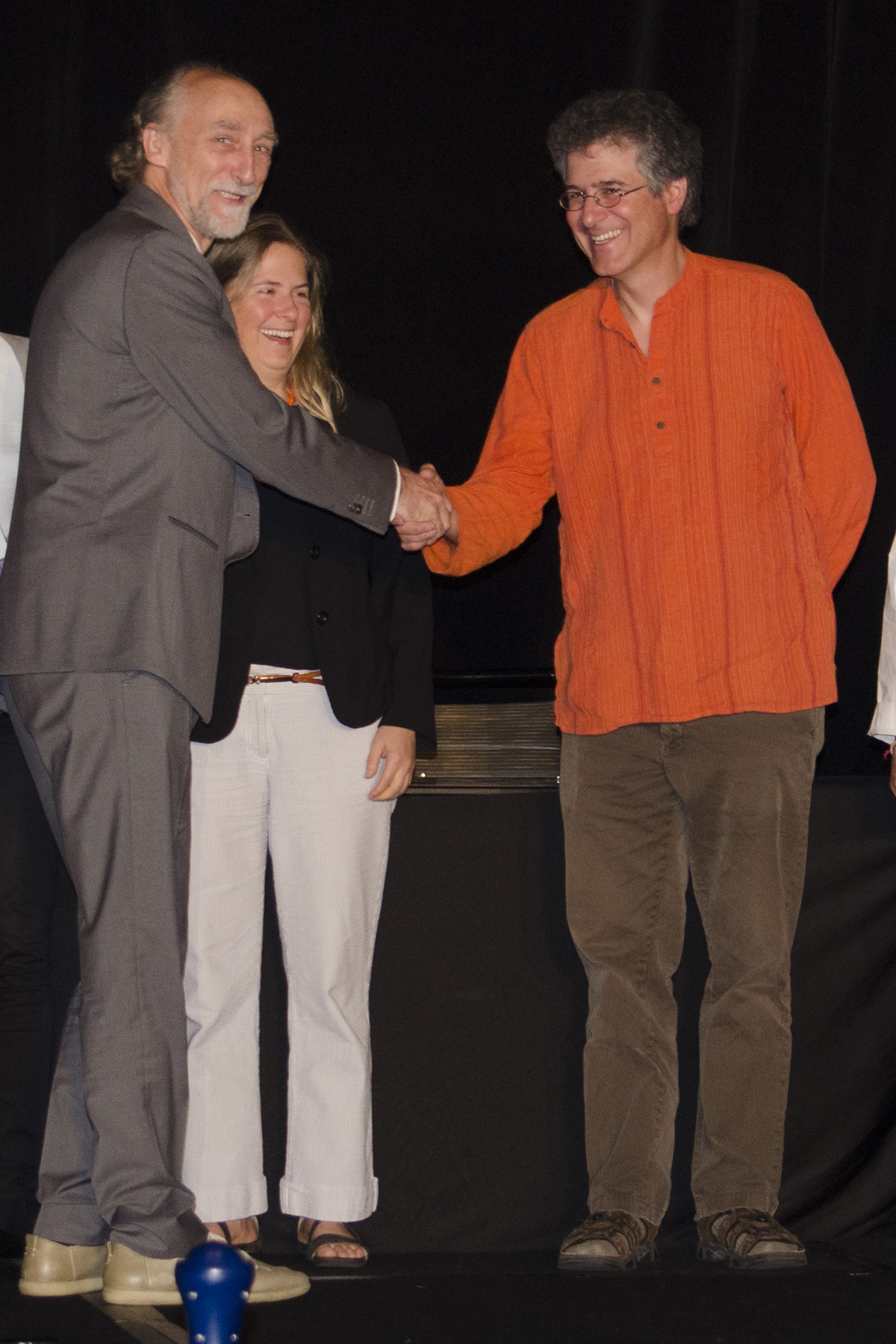
- Lincoln Stein with Alfonso Valencia (left) and Sarah Teichmann (center) at the Intelligent Systems for Molecular Biology (ISMB) conference in 2016 in Orlando, Florida.
- Born: Lincoln David Stein; 1960 (age 65–66)
- Education: Harvard University (MD, PhD)
- Known for: WormBase; BioPerl; Generic Model Organism Database (GMOD); Reactome; Sequence Ontology
- Awards: Benjamin Franklin Award (2004); ISCB Fellow (2016)
- Scientific career
- Fields: Bioinformatics, Genome informatics
- Workplaces: Ontario Institute for Cancer Research; Harvard Medical School; Whitehead Institute; Cold Spring Harbor Laboratory
- Thesis: Cloning of developmentally regulated genes from Schistosoma mansoni (1989)
- Website: oicr.on.ca/investigators/lincoln-stein

Lincoln David Stein is an American computational biologist and bioinformatician known for his contributions to community data resources, genome informatics, and open-source bioinformatics software. He is a senior investigator at the Ontario Institute for Cancer Research and a professor in the Department of Molecular Genetics at the University of Toronto.

Stein has played a leading role in the development of widely used bioinformatics infrastructure and biological data resources, including the Generic Model Organism Database project, BioPerl, WormBase, and the Reactome pathway database. His work has also contributed to large international genomics initiatives such as the International Cancer Genome Consortium and the Pan-Cancer Analysis of Whole Genomes (PCAWG) project.

== Education ==
Stein completed a Doctor of Medicine at Harvard Medical School and a PhD in Cell Biology at Harvard University both in 1989 via the MD-PhD program. His thesis investigated gene cloning in Schistosoma mansoni.

== Career ==
From 1992 to 1997, Stein served as director of informatics at the MIT Genome Center at the Whitehead Institute. During this period he worked on computational infrastructure for the Human Genome Project, contributing to early genome mapping resources and the development of model organism databases including early work on WormBase

From 1998 to 2007, he was an associate professor at Cold Spring Harbor Laboratory, where he led the development of several widely used bioinformatics resources and standards, including WormBase, the Sequence Ontology, and the Reactome pathway database, and contributed to international genomics initiatives such as the HapMap Project.

In 2007, Stein joined the Ontario Institute for Cancer Research as a senior investigator and later became a professor in the Department of Molecular Genetics at the University of Toronto. His work during this period has focused on computational infrastructure and data resources for large-scale cancer genomics, including contributions to the International Cancer Genome Consortium and the Pan-Cancer Analysis of Whole Genomes project.

== Research ==
Stein's work has focused on the development of widely used bioinformatics software and biological databases. He has contributed to several major community resources including WormBase, Reactome, BioPerl, the Generic Model Organism Database project, and the Sequence Ontology.

He has also participated in large international genomics initiatives including ENCODE and the modENCODE project.

Stein is the original developer of CGI.pm and a contributor to mod_perl, both widely used within the Perl programming language ecosystem for web applications. He has also authored several influential books on web programming and network programming in Perl.

== Selected books ==
- Stein, Lincoln D. (1997). How to Set Up and Maintain a Web Site. Addison-Wesley. ISBN 978-0-201-63462-4.
- Stein, Lincoln D. (1998). Official Guide to Programming with CGI.pm. Wiley. ISBN 978-0-471-24744-9.
- Stein, Lincoln D. (1998). Web Security: A Step-by-Step Reference Guide. Addison-Wesley. ISBN 978-0-201-63489-1.
- MacEachern, Doug; Stein, Lincoln D. (1999). Writing Apache Modules with Perl and C. O'Reilly Media. ISBN 978-1-56592-567-0.
- Stein, Lincoln D. (2001). Network Programming with Perl. Addison-Wesley. ISBN 978-0-201-61571-5.

== Awards and honours ==
Stein was awarded the Benjamin Franklin Award (Bioinformatics) in 2004. He was elected an ISCB Fellow in 2016 by the International Society for Computational Biology.
