= Damian Conway =

Australian computer programmer (born 1964)

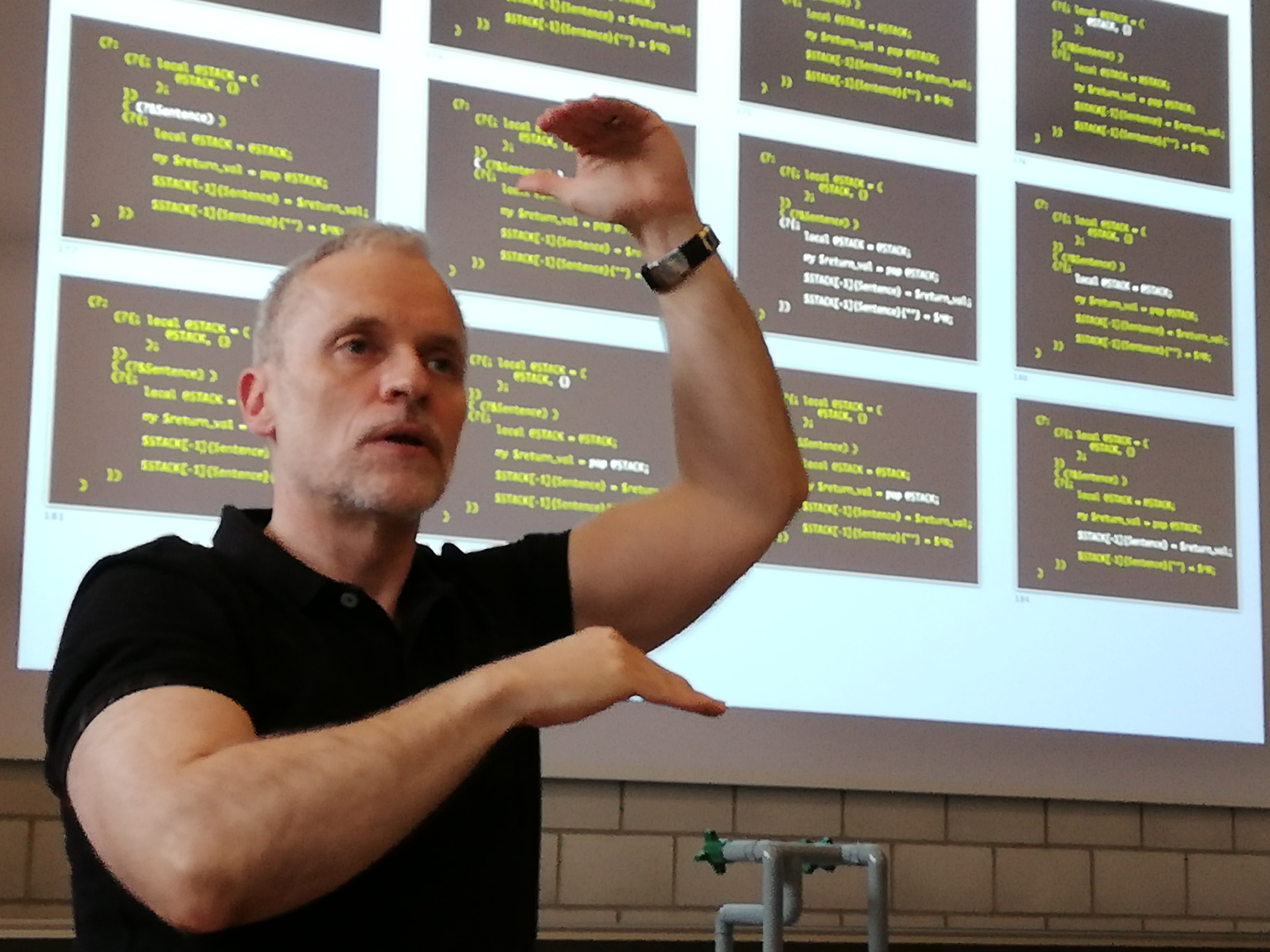
- Damian Conway giving a talk in Lausanne in 2020
- Born: 5 October 1964 (age 61); Melbourne, Australia
- Occupations: Author, programmer, professor, speaker
- Employer: Thoughtstream
- Known for: Perl 6 design

Damian Conway (born 5 October 1964 in Melbourne, Australia) is an Australian computer scientist, a member of the Perl and Raku communities, a public speaker, and the author of several books. Until 2010, he was also an adjunct associate professor in the Faculty of Information Technology at Monash University.

Damian completed his BSc (with honours) and PhD at Monash. He is perhaps best known for his contributions to Comprehensive Perl Archive Network (CPAN) and Raku (Perl 6) language design, and his training courses, both on programming techniques and public speaking skills.

He has won the Larry Wall Award three times for CPAN contributions. His involvement in Perl 6 language design has been as an interlocutor and explicator of Larry Wall.

He is one of the authors of the Significantly Prettier and Easier C++ Syntax (SPEC).

He is also the author of Perl Best Practices, a programming book focusing on standard practices for Perl coding style, encouraging the development of maintainable source code. published by O'Reilly.

== Books ==
- Object Oriented Perl: A Comprehensive Guide to Concepts and Programming Techniques (Manning Publications, 2000, ISBN 1-884777-79-1)
- Perl Best Practices (O'Reilly Media, 2005, ISBN 0-596-00173-8)
- (with "chromatic" and Curtis "Ovid" Poe) Perl Hacks: Tips & Tools for Programming, Debugging, and Surviving (Hacks) (O'Reilly Media, 2006, ISBN 0-596-52674-1)
