= Perl package manager =

Perl Package Manager (PPM) is a Perl utility intended to simplify the tasks of locating, installing, upgrading and removing software packages. It can determine if the most recent version of a software package is installed on a system, and can install or upgrade that package from a local or remote host.

PPM is widespread on Microsoft Windows systems, which often lack the C and C++ compilers necessary to build some Perl modules. Popular ActiveState's ActivePerl distribution comes with PPM included, other distributions can use PPM after acquiring and building PPM module from CPAN.

PPM uses so called “PPM Repositories”, collections of pre-compiled modules. These repositories contain a large variety of modules, published on CPAN.

As of ActivePerl 5.28, PPM is no longer supported.
