= Template Toolkit =

The Template Toolkit (TT) is a template engine used primarily for building web sites, but is also suitable for creating any type of digital document, such as a PDF or LaTeX file. Template Toolkit is based on a mini-language and does not allow direct Perl in its templates by default, unlike some competing products (e.g. Mason). This forces developers to separate business logic into Perl libraries, leaving only presentation logic in their templates. It is written in Perl, with some popular accessories in C. It is released under a free software licence (Perl Artistic Licence or GPL).

TT is used as a templating system for various Perl application frameworks, including the Catalyst MVC Framework, CGI::Application and the Maypole framework.

The Template Toolkit was written by Andy Wardley. The "prototype" for TT (the Text::MetaText Perl module) was released in 1996. The first version of TT proper was released in 1999. Version 2.00 a.k.a. TT2 was released in 2001. A revised and revamped TT3 was in development, but appears abandoned. In the meantime, TT2 is steadily improved and has been released as version 3 late 2019.
