= Chromatic (programmer) =

American computer programmer

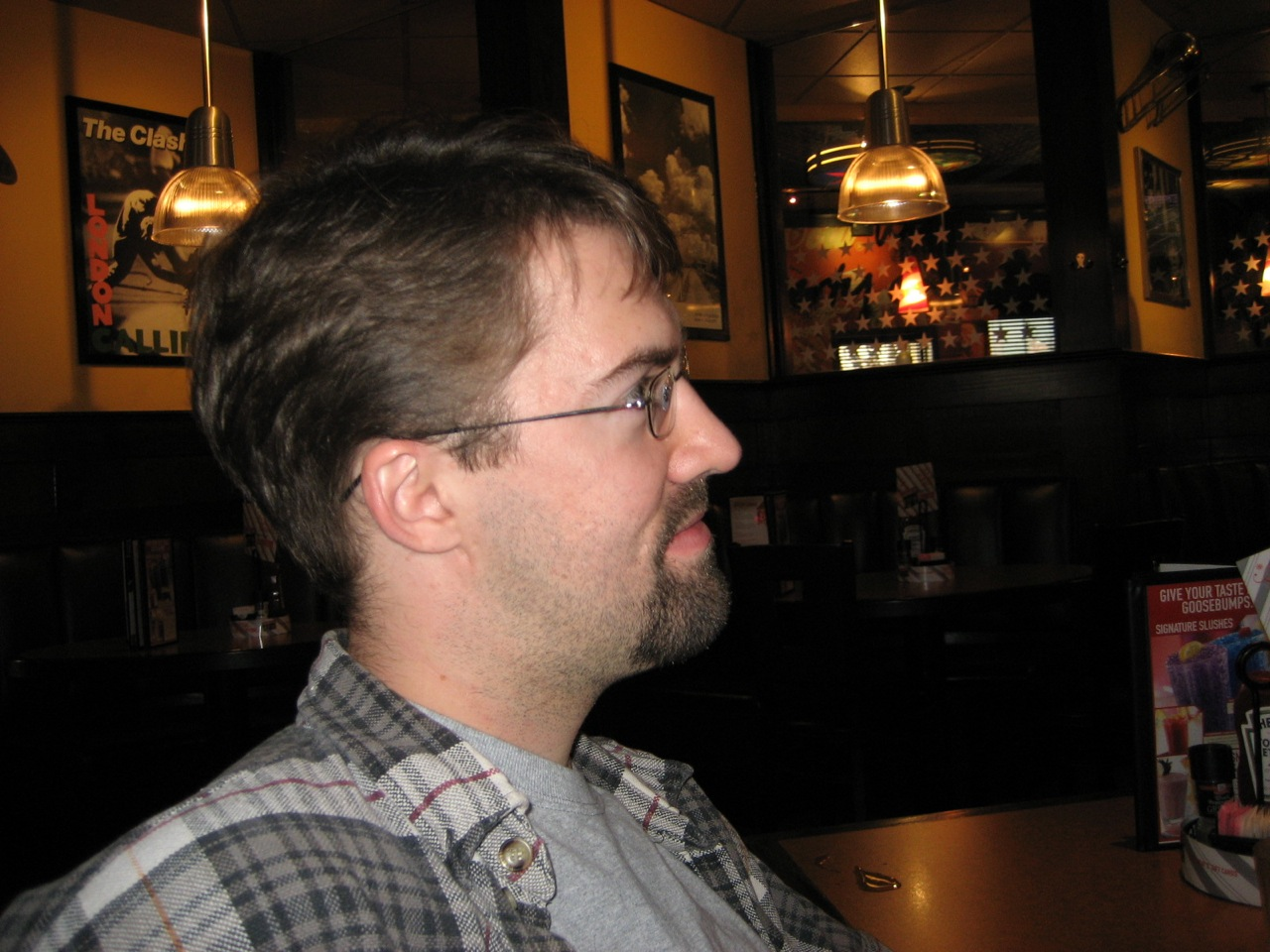
- Occupations: Programmer, author, editor, publisher
- Employer(s): Onyx Neon, Inc. Big Blue Marble
- Website: modernperlbooks.com

Chromatic is a writer and free software programmer best known for his work in the Perl programming language. He lives in Hillsboro, Oregon, United States. He wrote Extreme Programming Pocket Guide, was the lead author of Perl Hacks, co-wrote Perl Testing: A Developer's Notebook, and is an uncredited contributor to The Art of Agile Development. He has a music degree. Also, he has contributed to CPAN, Perl 5, Perl 6, and Parrot.

In 2009, he founded Modern Perl Books, in part to revitalize the world of Perl and to publish materials that other publishers had neglected.

In 2010, he released the book Modern Perl in print and in electronic form, with the latter redistributable freely (though with a suggested donation). An updated edition was released in 2012, with the entire text online.

== CPAN ==
While he may be currently known for the module "Modern::Perl", Chromatic originally wrote "Test::Builder", which is the foundation of most testing in the Perl world.

== Perl 6 ==
Chromatic spent several years as the Perl 6 project secretary. He is one of the biggest proponents of "roles" in Perl 6 (what some other programming languages refer to as "traits").

== Parrot ==
Chromatic has been a core developer of Parrot. He was also secretary of the Parrot Foundation from 2008 until 2010.
