= Perl Archive Toolkit =

Software toolkit

Perl Archive Toolkit (PAR) is a cross-platform packaging and deployment tool for computer applications and libraries written in the Perl programming language. Its name is inspired by Java's JAR (file format) technology. It was originally developed by Audrey Tang and is now maintained via the PAR development mailing list with help from numerous contributors.

Apart from creating, manipulating, loading, and installing binary PAR archives, the PAR module can be used to create standalone executables from complex applications using its PAR::Packer extension. Like many other Perl modules, PAR is primarily distributed via the CPAN where numerous extensions have been published. These include:

- PAR::WebStart, a Perl implementation of Java Web Start that allows users to start application software directly from the Internet using a web browser.
- PAR::Repository, a package management system for Perl applications and modules in PAR archives.
- MasonX::Resolver::PAR, an extension to the Mason web application framework for loading components from PAR archives.
- Apache::PAR, a Perl extension for including PAR files in a mod_perl (1.x or 2.x) environment.
