= LWN.net =

Computing webzine with an emphasis on Unix-like operating systems

LWN

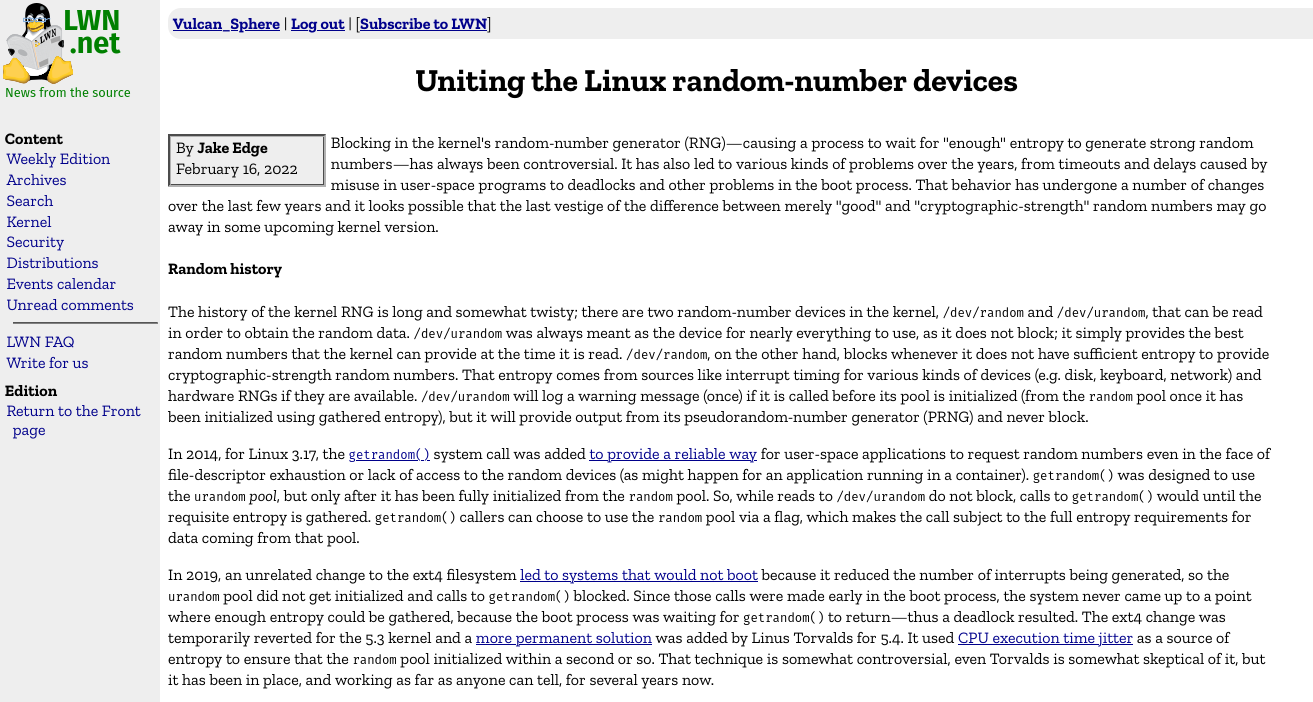
- A screenshot of LWN.net
- Website type: Online newspaper
- Available in: English
- Creators: Jonathan Corbet and Elizabeth Coolbaugh
- Revenue: Subscription, Advertisement
- Website: lwn.net
- IPv6 support: Yes
- Registration: Optional
- Users: Over 100,000
- Launched: January 29, 1998; 28 years ago
- Current status: Online
- Written in: Python

LWN.net is a computing webzine with an emphasis on free software and software for Linux and other Unix-like operating systems. It consists of a weekly issue, separate stories which are published most days, and threaded discussion attached to every story. Most news published daily are short summaries of articles published elsewhere, and are free to all viewers. Original articles are usually published weekly on Thursdays and are available only to subscribers for two weeks, after which they become free as well. LWN.net is part of Eklektix, Inc.

LWN caters to a more technical audience than other Linux/free software publications. It is often praised for its in-depth coverage of Linux kernel internals and Linux kernel mailing list (LKML) discussions.

The acronym "LWN" originally stood for Linux Weekly News; that name is no longer used because the site no longer covers exclusively Linux-related topics, and it has daily as well as weekly content.

== History ==
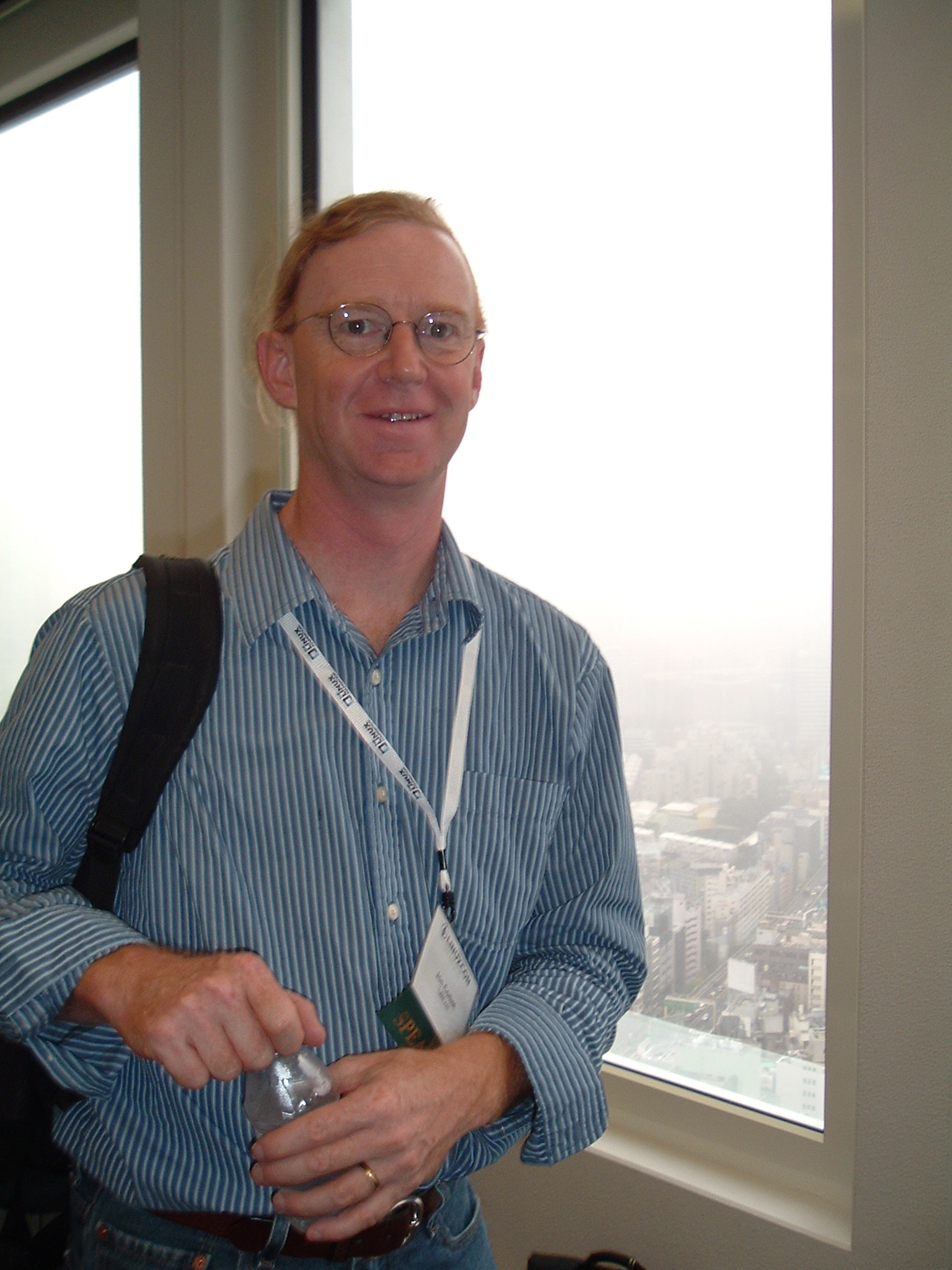
Jonathan Corbet at LinuxCon Japan (2010)

Founded by Jonathan Corbet and Elizabeth Coolbaugh and published since January 1998, LWN was originally a free site devoted to collecting Linux news, published weekly.

In 2000, Tucows acquired Linux Weekly News (which was then "unacquired" in 2002).

At the end of May 2002, LWN announced a redesigned site. Among the changes was a facility for readers to post comments about stories.

On July 25, 2002, LWN announced that due to its inability to raise enough funds through donations, the following issue would be its last. Following an outpouring of support from readers, the editors of LWN decided to continue publishing, albeit with a subscription model. New weekly editions of LWN are initially only available to readers who subscribe at one of three levels (group subscriptions are also available). After a 2-weeks delay, each issue becomes freely available to readers who are unable or unwilling to pay.

== Contributors ==
LWN.net staff, as of April 2024, consists of:

- Jonathan Corbet, Executive Editor, "Kernel coverage and more"
- Jake Edge, Editor, "Python coverage and more"
- Daroc Alden, Editor, "Programming language coverage and more"
- Joe Brockmeier, Editor, "Distribution coverage and more"

LWN.net also purchases a number of articles from freelance authors.

== See also ==
- DistroWatch
- Slashdot
- Phoronix
