= Genome informatics =

Genome informatics is a subfield of bioinformatics that uses computational tools to process and analyze genomic information through databases, algorithms, and bioinformatics applications. Genome informatics includes methods for analyzing DNA sequence data, predicting protein sequences and structures, and studying genomic datasets using genomic tools and technologies. These methods help in the analysis of complex traits, precision medicine, and research in evolutionary biology.

== Genomic Tools and Technologies ==
Genomic Tools and Technologies	Description	Application
DNA Sequencing (NGS)	Process of determining the order of nucleotides in a DNA sequence.	Whole genome sequencing; Exome sequencing; Targeted gene panels
Single Nucleotide Polymorphism (SNP) Analysis	Through the use of SNP arrays and genotyping platforms, single-base genetic variations can be detected.	Cancer Genomics; Linkage Analysis
Polymerase Chain Reaction (PCR)	Laboratory technique used to copy a specific DNA segment.	SNP genotyping; Insertion-deletion variants; Detection of rare sequences
Linkage Analysis	Method for mapping genes to chromosome locations based on heritable traits.	Mapping Mendelian traits with high penetrance in families
Genome-Wide Association Studies (GWAS)	Observational study of genetic variants across large populations to identify associations between SNP's and specific traits or diseases.	Identify and characterize disease susceptible variants
Fluorescence In Situ Hybridization (FISH)	Cytogenetic technique used to label chromosomal locations using fluorescent DNA probes.	Oncology diagnostics
Comparative Genomic Hybridization (CGH)	Cytogenetic technique used to determine DNA copy number variations across the entire genome of a patient.	Cancer genomics

== Precision Medicine ==
By using sequencing and computational analysis, genetic sequences can be examined to locate mutations that influence disease. Genetic variants are located and analyzed to help researchers figure out whether the variant is associated with a disease. By using this process, researchers can differentiate between common and harmful variants. This information is then used in precision medicine to determine disease risk and design treatments specifically for each person. Genome informatics is commonly used in oncology to identify tumor-specific mutations and develop targeted treatments. Advances in sequencing technology result in advances in medicine, which is why research in genome informatics is essential.
