= Catalyst (software) =

Open-source web application framework

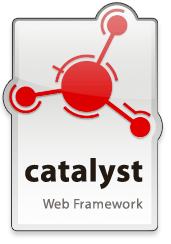
- Original author: Sebastian Riedel
- Stable release: 5.90131 / 20 July 2023; 3 years ago
- Written in: Perl
- Type: Web application framework
- License: PAL and GPL
- Website: http://catalyst.perl.org/

Catalyst is a web application framework written in Perl and based on the model–view–controller (MVC) architectural pattern. It began in 2005 as a fork of the Maypole framework, initially intended to become Maypole 3.0, and subsequently developed as its supported successor.

Catalyst is designed around the principles of don't repeat yourself (DRY), flexibility and reuse of existing Perl modules. Its model and view components can use a range of modules, while application-specific controller code can be supplemented by plugins providing functions such as authentication, session management and HTTP negotiation. Catalyst supports multiple web-server and deployment configurations, including CGI, FastCGI, mod_perl and PSGI, and can use databases supported through Perl DBI, with DBIx::Class commonly used as an object-relational mapping layer.

== History ==
Maypole was one of the first web application frameworks for the Perl programming language that was based on the MVC pattern; its principal author was Simon Cozens. Catalyst started as a fork of Maypole, intended to become Maypole 3.0. Development ceased on Maypole, however, with its most recent release in April 2008, and Catalyst became its modern supported equivalent.

The first development release of Catalyst took place on 28 January 2005. The first official version was published on CPAN on 16 February 2005. As of June 2011, Catalyst had 201 registered contributors.

== Philosophy ==
Catalyst is based on the "don't repeat yourself" (DRY) principle, which means that definitions should only have to be made once. Catalyst can be used with automatic class loading from the database through one of the many loader modules, thus requiring no code for the database layer. But, if you require the flexibility of manually doing everything, it's also an option. Another guiding principle of Catalyst is flexibility.

Catalyst promotes the re-use of existing Perl modules that already handle common web application concerns well.

- The Model part is handled through DBIx::Class, Plucene, Net::LDAP and other model classes.
- The View layer is usually handled by Template Toolkit, Mason, or HTML::Template, among others.
- The Controller layer is of course written by each application author. Large chunks of Controller functionality can usually be deferred to one of the many Catalyst plugins (e.g., Catalyst::Plugin::FormValidator, Catalyst::Plugin::Prototype, Catalyst::Plugin::Account::AutoDiscovery, etc.).
- Finally, Catalyst offers a set of helpers to simplify flow control and mapping URLs to controller methods.

Catalyst has a large selection of plugins. For example, it has JavaScript generation for Ajax and RIAs using the Catalyst::Plugin::Prototype module (prototype is an Ajax framework). Plugins cover many areas, for example authentication, session management, HTTP negotiation and REST.

Catalyst can also be used with other Ajax frameworks such as jQuery or YUI, the Yahoo! User Interface Library.

== Web server support ==
For development and testing, Catalyst has a built-in simple HTTP server. For production use, Apache, lighttpd, Hiawatha, Cherokee or nginx with FastCGI or mod_perl support is recommended, but any web server with CGI or FastCGI support will work. On Apache, mod_perl can help with performance considerably, though its use might be an issue because it can be unsafe to share multiple applications under mod_perl.

Since early 2008, Catalyst applications can also be deployed using the HTTP::Prefork engine which provides for the deployment of high performance Catalyst applications without a separate web server. Starting with the release of Catalyst 5.9, Catalyst also outputs to the PSGI spec thus it can be run on any Plack server and along with any server or protocol that supports the PSGI spec, including Mongrel2.

== Database support ==
Catalyst can run using any database supported by Perl's DBI (this means almost anything, even a CSV file), but a proper RDBMS or ODBMS is recommended. The database access is entirely abstracted from the programmer's point of view and Catalyst, through one of its model classes, handles access to all databases automatically – though, if needed, using direct SQL queries is possible. This enables database-neutrality, application portability over different database systems, and usability of pre-existing databases for Catalyst application development as much as possible, though due to different feature sets of the RDBMSes, it is not completely guaranteed by the framework alone. Several different RDBMS systems are supported, including MySQL, PostgreSQL, SQLite, IBM Db2, Oracle and Microsoft SQL Server. For ODBMSes, there is explicit support for KiokuDB via Catalyst::Model::KiokuDB. The Model abstraction allows databases of any nature to be accessed via Catalyst::Model::Adaptor.

Many Catalyst-based projects use DBIx::Class as the ORM layer, which provides further abstraction of SQL queries, using a resultset-based API with transparent support for arbitrary joins and other features.

== Uses ==
Websites powered by Catalyst include Magazines.com, bbc.co.uk iPlayer backend, DuckDuckGo's Community Platform, http://flexibase.io and Tripwolf.com. The MojoMojo wiki engine is written using Catalyst.

YouPorn was powered by Catalyst until 2012.

== See also ==
- Comparison of web frameworks
