= DBIx::Class =

Perl module

DBIx::Class (often abbreviated as DBIC) is an object–relational mapper for Perl. It is used to map relational database table rows to Perl objects and generates SQL queries transparently to the application developer. It also implements the active record pattern. It is popular in Web application frameworks such as Catalyst and Dancer.

== See also ==
- DBI
- Other object–relational mappers for Perl
