= Big Medium =

- Developer: Josh Clark
- Initial release: January 13, 2003
- Stable release: 2.0 / December 17, 2007
- Operating system: Cross-platform
- Platform: Perl
- Available in: English
- Type: Web content management system
- License: Proprietary EULA
- Website: globalmoxie.com

Big Medium was a browser-based web content management system (CMS) written in the Perl programming language and developed by Global Moxie, the Paris-based company of independent developer Josh Clark.

== History ==
Big Medium 1.0 was announced on January 13, 2003. The last release of Big Medium was version 2.0, released on December 17, 2007 after more than a year of public beta-testing. It was paid software distributed under a proprietary license. On February 19, 2012 the developer announced that there would be no additional development and support of the product.

The name "Big Medium" is a double entendre, referring to both the Internet as a communication medium and to a medium as a psychic who helps ordinary people communicate with unseen worlds.

== Audience ==
Big Medium is billed as a CMS "aimed at web designers and their clients," and unlike many general-purpose content management systems, it is intended to be easy to install and configure without the aid of a web developer. Big Medium's flexible design templates support a wide range of original designs and require no programming knowledge beyond HTML and CSS. Once these templates are configured, content editors can add and update pages with no specific technical knowledge. (Big Medium also comes with a modest library of design themes allowing non-designers to get started right away.)

Big Medium targets traditional content sites such as news, marketing and magazine sites. It is pre-configured to provide features and data fields common to this type of site. While this simplifies the process of setting up Big Medium for a broad category of websites, this targeted pre-configuration makes the software relatively inflexible for managing other site types, including commerce or community sites. However, additional fields and content types can be added via custom plugin modules.

== Features ==
- Static pages
- WYSIWYG CSS style editor
- Version control for page edits
- Search engine-friendly URLs
- Simple, flexible templating for complete control over the design
- Rich-text editing with WYSIWYG editor or Markdown syntax
- Libraries for images, documents, media and authors promote easy reuse
- Auto-sizing of images and thumbnails
- Image galleries and slideshows
- Pullquotes
- Site search
- Visitor comments, with anti-spam features including built-in Akismet support
- Tags and tag clouds
- Extensible plugin support
- Integrated link management
- Manage multiple websites
- Lightweight publishing workflow
- Scheduled publication of pages
- Unlimited levels of nested sub-categories for pages
- Multiple editor accounts with category-specific editing privileges
- Syndication via RSS news feeds and JavaScript widgets

== Technical details ==
Big Medium installs on web servers running Windows NT, Windows 2003 or a Unix-like operating system.

Big Medium stores its data in flat files and folders, rather than a database. This has advantages (e.g., simplified installation and backups) but also means that it is best suited for small- and medium-sized sites with fewer than several thousand pages. Clark has suggested that future versions may offer the choice between flat-file storage and a relational database to better support very large sites. Additional fields and content types can be added via custom plugin modules.

Big Medium generates public webpages as static pages, meaning that they are not built on the fly with every page request but just once when the page is edited. This approach scales well under very high traffic conditions but means that there are limited opportunities to personalize pages for individual users.

Big Medium supports plugins and can be extended via custom Perl code to add additional content types, data fields, content filters, display widgets, etc. This developer API was added in version 2.0, but the documentation for plugins is incomplete.

== See also ==
- Content Management Interface
- List of content management systems
- Comparison of content management systems
