= Perlbal =

Reverse proxy software

- Developer: Danga Interactive
- Stable release: 1.80 / February 27, 2012; 14 years ago
- Written in: Perl
- Type: Reverse proxy
- License: GNU General Public License / Artistic License
- Website: www.danga.com/perlbal/
- Repository: github.com/perlbal/Perlbal

Perlbal is a Perl-based reverse proxy, load balancer, and web server. Developed and maintained by Danga Interactive, Perlbal is widely used by high-traffic websites to distribute requests across multiple servers.

Like Perl itself, Perlbal is distributed under both the GNU General Public License and the Artistic License, making it free software.

== Features ==
=== Re-proxy mechanism ===
Perlbal supports a re-proxy mechanism, whereby a backend web application can return a lightweight response that functions as an internal redirect, instructing Perlbal to retrieve the actual response data from a separate source. This is commonly used to offload static file serving from application servers to simpler, faster HTTP servers, freeing application server capacity for dynamic processing. The re-proxy mechanism is most frequently used in conjunction with MogileFS.

=== Plugin support ===
Perlbal supports a plugin architecture that enables functionality traditionally handled at the application layer to be performed at the proxy layer instead. As one example, a filter plugin has been developed that can dynamically alter the colour palette of PNG and GIF images as they pass through the proxy. This capability is used on LiveJournal to support customisable page templates, allowing users to adjust the colour scheme of a page — including colours embedded in images — without involving the application servers. Performing such transformations at the proxy layer reduces load on backend infrastructure.
