= Matt's Script Archive =

Matt's Script Archive is a collection of CGI scripts written in the Perl programming language. Started in 1995 by Matt Wright (at the time a high school student in Fort Collins, Colorado), the archive contains about a dozen free scripts, designed to be easily added to a site and configured. One of the scripts, FormMail, is claimed to be the most popular CGI script on the World Wide Web, with over 2 million downloads since 1997.

As the scripts grew in popularity they were criticized for being insecure. The FormMail.pl script, in particular, was exploited by spammers to send junk email. SecurityFocus put attacks based on FormMail.pl third in their list of the Top Attacks for the 1st Quarter of 2002. As Perl 5 became more mature, norms in the community changed to encourage use of modules such as CGI.pm and code safety features such as strictures and taint checking; the scripts in Matt's Script Archive, however, did not follow these changes, and as a result (and also because Matt Wright wrote much of the code when he was an inexperienced programmer) tend to be buggy. Experienced Perl programmers usually recommend against the use of these scripts, and the London Perl Mongers started an effort called "nms" to write drop-in replacements for them. Matt Wright himself has recommended using the nms scripts, saying:

I would highly recommend downloading the nms versions if you wish to learn CGI programming. The code you find at Matt's Script Archive is not representative of how even I would code these days.

Most of the scripts at Matt's Script Archive ceased to be updated after 1996, with the exception of security flaws or bugs.

== See also ==
- History of the World Wide Web
