= NTP pool =

Networked computers providing time synchronization

- Website: www.ntppool.org/en/
- IPv6 support: Yes, but partly
- Launched: 2003; 23 years ago

The NTP pool is a dynamic collection of networked computers that volunteer to provide highly accurate time via the Network Time Protocol to clients worldwide. The machines that are "in the pool" are part of the pool.ntp.org domain as well as of several subdomains divided by geographical zone and are distributed to NTP clients via round-robin DNS. The geographic zone selection is sometimes unnecessary, obviated either by authoritative DNS servers that use geolocation or anycast server addresses.

As of May 2026, the pool consists of 3,790 active servers on IPv4 and 2,280 active servers on IPv6. (Note: IPv6 support is only partially enabled, via domain names starting with 2..) Because of the decentralization of this project, accurate statistics on the number of clients cannot be obtained, but according to the project's website, the pool provides time to hundreds of millions of systems around the world.

The pool consists of the following parts:

- Website
- NTP time servers. Because of client growth, the project is in perpetual need of more servers. The more time servers there are in the pool, the lower the resource demand on each member. Joining the pool requires a static IP address, and accurate time from another NTP server. Joining the server can be done on the website.
- Monitoring clients, which fetch time from candidate NTP servers and compare it with known-good values, producing scores that reflect accuracy and reliability. Only NTP servers with scores greater than 10 are considered for DNS distribution.
- Specialized DNS servers, which direct clients to the actual pool servers using a combination of the requested zone and geolocation of the requesting client. To add servers to pools volunteers can submit information to the organizations running them.

This project was started by Adrian von Bidder in January 2003 after a discussion on comp.protocols.time.ntp about abuse of the public stratum 1 servers. The system has been maintained and developed by Ask Bjørn Hansen since July 2005.

The NTP pool occasionally see misuse and abuse, mostly from corporate vendors with many users shipping defectively designed software. The project advises that vendors apply for their own zones, so that usage patterns are easier to keep track of.
