= Robert Love =

American author, speaker, engineer and open source software developer

- Born: c. 1981; Florida, United States
- Education: University of Florida (BA, BS)
- Occupation: Software engineer

Robert M. Love (born c. 1981) is an American author, speaker, Google engineer, and open source software developer.

Love is best known for his contributions to the Linux kernel, with notable work including the preemptive kernel, process scheduler, kernel event layer, virtual memory subsystem, and inotify. At Google, he was a member of the Android team and helped launch the first version of the platform. Love is also active in the GNOME community, working on NetworkManager, GNOME Volume Manager, Project Utopia and Beagle.

== Biography ==
Love was born in 1981 in south Florida. He attended and graduated from Charles W. Flanagan High School. For his undergraduate studies, he attended the University of Florida, where he graduated with both a Bachelor of Arts in Mathematics and a Bachelor of Science in Computer Science.

While still in college, Love was employed as a kernel hacker at MontaVista Software. At MontaVista, he worked on procps and several kernel-related projects, including one of his most notable, the preemptive kernel.

Love began work at Ximian on December 15, 2003, where he first served as Senior Engineer in the Linux Desktop Group. At Ximian, he spearheaded an effort, named Project Utopia, to better integrate hardware management into the Linux desktop. After Ximian's acquisition by Novell, Love rose to the position of Chief Architect of SUSE Linux Enterprise Desktop. At Novell, he worked on various kernel and GNOME projects, including inotify and Beagle.

Love resigned from Novell on May 4, 2007, to work at Google on their mobile device platform, Android. Joining the project before it was announced, he engineered several kernel and system-level solutions for Android, including its novel shared memory subsystem, ashmem. Love worked at Google as Director of Engineering for Search Infrastructure through May 2021. Love now works as VP of Engineering at Toast where he builds cloud platforms for restaurants.

Love lives in Boston, Massachusetts.

== Writing and speaking ==
Love is the author of Linux Kernel Development, now in its third edition, a book on understanding and developing code for the Linux kernel. The book is widely regarded as approachable and well written and has been translated into several languages. All three editions are published by imprints of Pearson Education.

He also wrote Linux System Programming, now in its second edition, subtitled Talking Directly to the Kernel and C Library, and published by O'Reilly Media. This work documents Linux's system call and C library API.

Love is also a coauthor of Linux in a Nutshell, a comprehensive Linux command reference also published by O'Reilly Media. "Linux in a Nutshell" was awarded "Favorite Linux Book of All Time" by Linux Journal.

Love is Contributing Editor for Linux Journal and author of articles for the magazine.

Love has been invited to speak around the world, including linux.conf.au in Australia, FOSDEM in Belgium, and GUADEC in England, where he was a keynote speaker.

== Bibliography ==
Love has written and co-written several books on the Linux operating system:

- Love, Robert (2003). Linux Kernel Development (1 ed.). SAMS Publishing. ISBN 0-672-32512-8.
- Love, Robert (2005). Linux Kernel Development (2 ed.). Novell Press. ISBN 978-0-672-32720-9.
- Love, Robert (2010). Linux Kernel Development (3 ed.). Addison–Wesley. ISBN 978-0-672-32946-3.
- Siever, Ellen; Stephen Figgins; Aaron Weber; Robert Love (2006). Linux in a Nutshell (5 ed.). O'Reilly Media. ISBN 978-0-596-00930-4.
- Siever, Ellen; Stephen Figgins; Robert Love; Aaron Weber (2009). Linux in a Nutshell (6 ed.). O'Reilly Media. ISBN 978-0-596-15448-6.
- Love, Robert (2007). Linux System Programming (1 ed.). O'Reilly Media. ISBN 978-0-596-00958-8.
- Love, Robert (2013). Linux System Programming (2 ed.). O'Reilly Media. ISBN 978-1-449-33953-1.
