= MARC (archive) =

MARC (Mailing list ARChive) is a computer-related mailing list archive. It archives over 31 million e-mails from over 2400 mailing lists, with approximately 320,000 new mails added per month. The archive is hosted by KoreLogic, and is maintained by a group of volunteers led by Hank Leininger.

Mailing list indexes includes popular mailing list such as Linux kernel mailing list.

MARC was founded in 1996 to serve as a unified archive of electronic mailing lists, similar to what DejaNews (now Google Groups) did for Usenet.

MARC uses a MySQL relational database to store its messages and Perl to access the data. The archive can be searched for mailing list names, authors, subject lines and full-text of the e-mail messages.

== Privacy criticism ==
In controversy with the right to be forgotten, MARC is very reluctant to delete posts upon user requests.

The strict requirements are:

- On request from an original poster ... that is agreed-to by the list admin/owner.
- Court orders to remove messages

Mails not conforming to this rules are ignored and not responded to.
