= AxKit =

Software publishing framework

Apache AxKit
- Developer: Apache Software Foundation
- Final release: 1.7 / November 4, 2005; 20 years ago
- Written in: Perl
- Operating system: Cross-platform
- Type: XML
- License: Apache License 2.0
- Website: web.archive.org/web/20141008204847/http://www.axkit.org/

Apache AxKit was an XML Apache publishing framework run by the Apache foundation written in Perl. It provided conversion from XML to any format, such as HTML, WAP or text using either W3C standard techniques, or flexible custom code.

AxKit was a standard tool in early digital humanities presentation work, being used to convert formats such as Text Encoding Initiative XML to HTML. It is still used by some institutions, but software such as eXist and Apache Cocoon is normally used in modern projects.

Apache Axkit was retired in August 2009.
