= Bricolage (software) =

Content management system

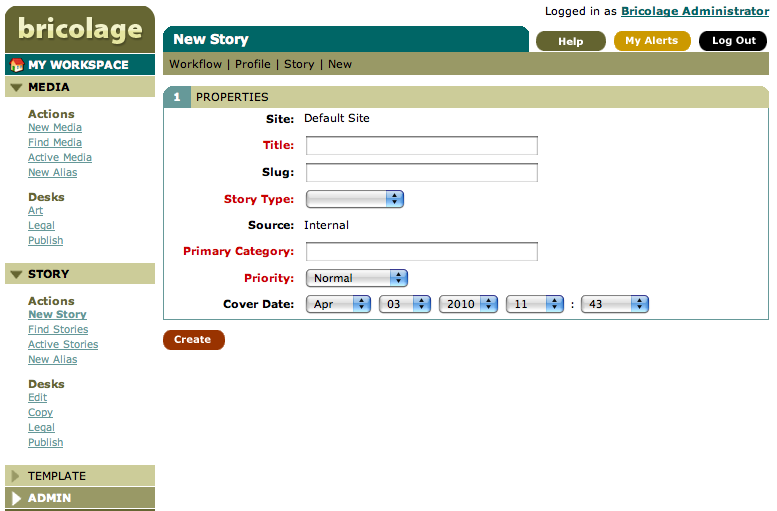
- Bricolage administration screen
- Developer: David Wheeler
- Stable release: 2.0.1 / February 9, 2011; 14 years ago
- Operating system: Cross-platform
- Type: Content management system
- License: BSD license
- Website: www.bricolagecms.org

Bricolage was a content management system (CMS) written in the Perl programming language.

Bricolage was described as an Enterprise Class CMS, competitive in features and capability to high end, high cost proprietary products. Examples of organizations whose web sites use Bricolage include the World Health Organization, Rand Corporation, Macworld, and The Tyee.

Originally authored by David Wheeler to manage content for Salon.com, Bricolage is now maintained by a small group of core developers. Released under the revised BSD license, Bricolage is free and open source software.

== Design ==
Bricolage ran on the Apache web server on the Linux, BSD, Mac OS X and Solaris platforms. It can use either the PostgreSQL, MySQL and Oracle database management system and mod_perl.

Bricolage was inherently a multi user CMS, designed to manage workflow for large websites with many contributors. Bricolage uses a template development model and completely separates presentation from management of content. The CMS did reside on a different server than the web site or other data store being managed.

Native PHP support was added in Bricolage 1.10, that embeds a PHP 5 interpreter inside a Perl 5 interpreter. As a result, PHP code runs in a native PHP 5 environment, but can also transparently make use of any and all Perl libraries, including the complete Bricolage API.

== Etymology ==
The name is probably based on the noun bricolage, meaning "Something constructed using whatever was available at the time".

== See also ==
- List of content management systems
