= CPAN =

Perl module software repository

CPAN logo

The Comprehensive Perl Archive Network (CPAN) is a software repository of over 220,000 software modules and accompanying documentation for 45,500 distributions, written in the Perl programming language by over 14,500 contributors. CPAN can denote either the archive network or the Perl program that acts as an interface to the network and as an automated software installer (somewhat like a package manager). Most software on CPAN is free and open source software.

== History ==
CPAN was conceived in 1993 and has been active online since October 1995. It is based on the CTAN model and began as a place to unify the structure of scattered Perl archives.

== Role ==
Like many programming languages, Perl has mechanisms to use external libraries of code, making one file contain common routines used by several programs. Perl calls these modules. Perl modules are typically installed in one of several directories whose paths are placed in the Perl interpreter when it is first compiled; on Unix-like operating systems, common paths include /usr/lib/perl5, /usr/local/lib/perl5, and several of their subdirectories.

Perl comes with a small set of core modules. Some of these perform bootstrapping tasks, such as ExtUtils::MakeMaker, which is used to create Makefiles for building and installing other extension modules; others, like List::Util, are merely commonly used.

CPAN's main purpose is to help programmers locate modules and programs not included in the Perl standard distribution. Its structure is decentralized. Authors maintain and improve their own modules. Forking, and creating competing modules for the same task or purpose, is common. There is a third-party bug tracking system that is automatically set up for any uploaded distribution, but authors may opt to use a different bug tracking system such as GitHub. Similarly, though GitHub is a popular location to store the source for distributions, it may be stored anywhere the author prefers, or may not be publicly accessible at all. Maintainers may grant permissions to others to maintain or take over their modules, and permissions may be granted by admins for those wishing to take over abandoned modules. Previous versions of updated distributions are retained on CPAN until deleted by the uploader, and a secondary mirror network called BackPAN retains distributions even if they are deleted from CPAN. Also, the complete history of the CPAN and all its modules is available as the GitPAN project, allowing to easily see the complete history for all the modules and for easy maintenance of forks. CPAN is also used to distribute new versions of Perl, as well as related projects, such as Parrot and Raku.

== Structure ==
Files on the CPAN are referred to as distributions. A distribution may consist of one or more modules, documentation files, or programs packaged in a common archiving format, such as a gzipped tar archive or a ZIP file. Distributions will often contain installation scripts (usually called Makefile.PL or Build.PL) and test scripts which can be run to verify the contents of the distribution are functioning properly. New distributions are uploaded to the Perl Authors Upload Server, or PAUSE (see the section Uploading distributions with PAUSE).

In 2003, distributions started to include metadata files, called META.yml, indicating the distribution's name, version, dependencies, and other useful information; however, not all distributions contain metadata. When metadata is not present in a distribution, the PAUSE's software will try to analyze the code in the distribution to look for the same information; this is not necessarily very reliable. In 2010, version 2 of this specification was created to be used via a new file called META.json, with the YAML format file often also included for backward compatibility.

With thousands of distributions, CPAN needs to be structured to be useful. Authors often place their modules in the natural hierarchy of Perl module names (such as Apache::DBI or Lingua::EN::Inflect) according to purpose or domain, though this is not enforced.

CPAN module distributions usually have names in the form of CGI-Application-3.1 (where the :: used in the module's name has been replaced with a dash, and the version number has been appended to the name), but this is only a convention; many prominent distributions break the convention, especially those that contain multiple modules. Security restrictions prevent a distribution from ever being replaced with an identical filename, so virtually all distribution names do include a version number.

== Components ==
The distribution infrastructure of CPAN consists of its worldwide network of more than 250 mirrors in more than 60 countries. Each full mirror hosts around 36 gigabytes of data.

Most mirrors update themselves hourly, daily or bidaily from the CPAN master site. Some sites are major FTP servers which mirror lots of other software, but others are simply servers owned by companies that use Perl heavily. There are at least two mirrors on every continent except Antarctica.

Several search engines have been written to help Perl programmers sort through the CPAN. The official search.cpan.org includes textual search, a browsable index of modules, and extracted copies of all distributions currently on the CPAN. On 16 May 2018, the Perl Foundation announced that search.cpan.org would be shut down on 29 June 2018 (after 19 years of operation), due to its aging codebase and maintenance burden. Users will be transitioned and redirected to the third-party alternative MetaCPAN.

CPAN Testers are a group of volunteers, who will download and test distributions as they are uploaded to CPAN. This enables the authors to have their modules tested on many platforms and environments to which they otherwise lack access, thus improving portability, and quality. Smoke testers send reports, which are then collated and used for a variety of presentation websites, including the main reports site, statistics, and dependencies.

Authors can upload new distributions to the CPAN through the Perl Authors Upload Server (PAUSE). To do so, they must request a PAUSE account.

Once registered, they may use a web interface at pause.perl.org, or an FTP interface to upload files to their directory and delete them. Modules in the upload will only be indexed as canonical if the module name has not been used before (granting first-come permission to the uploader), or if the uploader has permission for that name, and if the module is a higher version than any existing entry. This can be specified through PAUSE's web interface.

== CPAN.pm, CPANPLUS, and cpanminus ==
There is also a Perl core module named CPAN; it is usually differentiated from the repository itself by using the name CPAN.pm. CPAN.pm is mainly an interactive shell which can be used to search for, download, and install distributions. An interactive shell called cpan is also provided in the Perl core, and is the usual way of running CPAN.pm. After a short configuration process and mirror selection, it uses tools available on the user's computer to automatically download, unpack, compile, test, and install modules. It can also self-update.

An effort to replace CPAN.pm with something cleaner and more modern resulted in the CPANPLUS (or CPAN++) set of modules. CPANPLUS separates the back-end work of downloading, compiling, and installing modules from the interactive shell used to issue commands. It supports several advanced features, such as cryptographic signature checking, test result reporting, and uninstalling a distribution. CPANPLUS was added to the Perl core in version 5.10.0, and removed from it in version 5.20.0.

A smaller, leaner modern alternative to these CPAN installers was developed called cpanminus. cpanminus was designed to have a much smaller memory footprint as often required in limited memory environments, and to be usable as a standalone script such that it can even install itself, requiring only the expected set of core Perl modules to be available. It is also available from CPAN as the module App::cpanminus, which installs the cpanm script. It does not maintain or rely on a persistent configuration, but is configured only by the environment and command-line options. cpanminus does not have an interactive shell component. It recognizes the cpanfile format for specifying prerequisites, useful in ad-hoc Perl projects that may not be designed for CPAN installation. cpanminus also has the ability to uninstall distributions.

Each of these modules can check a distribution's dependencies and recursively install any prerequisites, either automatically or with individual user approval. Each support FTP and HTTP and can work through firewalls and proxies.

== Influence ==
Experienced Perl programmers often comment that half of Perl's power is in the CPAN. It has been called Perl's killer app. It is roughly equivalent to Composer for PHP; the PyPI (Python Package Index) repository for Python; RubyGems for Ruby; CRAN for R; npm for Node.js; LuaRocks for Lua; Maven for Java; and Hackage for Haskell. CPAN's use of arbitrated name spaces, a testing regime and a well defined documentation style makes it unique.

Given its importance to the Perl developer community, the CPAN both shapes and is shaped by Perl's culture. Its "self-appointed master librarian", Jarkko Hietaniemi, often takes part in the April Fools' Day jokes; on 1 April 2002 the site was temporarily named to CJAN, where the "J" stood for "Java". In 2003, the www.cpan.org domain name was redirected to Matt's Script Archive, a site infamous in the Perl community for having badly written code.

Some of the distributions on the CPAN are distributed as jokes. The Acme:: hierarchy is reserved for joke modules; for instance, Acme::Don't adds a don't function that doesn't run the code given to it (to complement the do built-in, which does). Even outside the Acme:: hierarchy, some modules are still written largely for amusement; one example is Lingua::Romana::Perligata, which can be used to write Perl programs in a subset of Latin.

In 2005, a group of Perl developers who also had an interest in JavaScript got together to create JSAN, the JavaScript Archive Network. The JSAN is a near-direct port of the CPAN infrastructure for use with the JavaScript language, which for most of its lifespan did not have a cohesive "community".

In 2008, after a chance meeting with CPAN admin Adam Kennedy at the Open Source Developers Conference, Linux kernel developer Rusty Russell created the CCAN, the Comprehensive C Archive Network. The CCAN is a direct port of the CPAN architecture for use with the C language.

CRAN, the Comprehensive R Archive Network, is a set of mirrors hosting the R language distribution(s), documentation, and contributed extensions.

== See also ==
- CTAN — site hosting TeX materials
- List of Perl software and tools
