= Joseph Hall =

Joseph Hall may refer to:

== Sports ==
- Jack Hall (footballer, born 1890) (Joseph Edward Hall 1890–?), English-born football fullback for Barnsley, Manchester City and Bristol Rovers
- Joe Hall (American football) (born 1979), American football player
- Joe Hall (baseball) (born 1966), American baseball player
- Joe Hall (ice hockey) (1881–1919), Canadian ice hockey player
- Joe B. Hall (1928–2022), American college basketball coach
- Joseph Hall (decathlete) (born 1909), American decathlete, runner-up at the 1934 USA Outdoor Track and Field Championships
- Joseph Hall (hurdler), American hurdler, winner of the 440 yards hurdles at the 1922 USA Outdoor Track and Field Championships

== Others ==
- Joe Hall (accordionist), American zydeco accordionist
- Joseph Hall (bishop) (1574–1656), English bishop, satirist and moralist
- Joseph Hall (metallurgist) (1789–1862)
- Joseph Hall (Maine politician) (1793–1859), US Representative from Maine
- Joseph Hall (mayor) (1800s–1857), mayor of Adelaide, 1854–1855
- Joe Hall (musician) (1947–2019), Canadian singer-songwriter
- Joe Hall (trade unionist) (1887–1964), British trade unionist
- Joseph M. Hall, Jr., historian, writer and professor
- Joseph N. Hall (born 1966), American author
- Joe Hall, founder of the Ghetto Film School
- Francis Joseph Hall (1857–1932), American Episcopal theologian and priest in the Anglo-Catholic tradition

== See also ==
- Murder of Jeff Hall, by his 10-year-old son Joseph Hall
