= Henry Jones =

Henry Jones may refer to:

== Arts ==
- Hank Jones (1918–2010), American jazz pianist
- Henry Jones (poet) (1721–1770), poet and dramatist, born Drogheda, Louth
- Henry Jones (photographer) (1826–1911), commercial photographer in Victoria and South Australia
- Henry Arthur Jones (1851–1929), English playwright
- Henry B. Jones (1887–1971), African American artist
- Henry Festing Jones (1851–1928), author
- Henry Jones Thaddeus (1859–1929), Irish painter
- Henry Stuart Jones (1867–1939), British academic, professor ancient history
- Henry Jones (actor) (1912–1999), American stage, film and television actor
- Henry Wanton Jones (1925–2021), Canadian painter
- Henry Z Jones Jr. (born 1940), genealogist and actor
- M. Henry Jones (1957–2022), American visual artist
- Henry Jones (1888–1948), birth name of the African American singer, actor, and jazz musician Broadway Jones

== Business and charity ==
- Henry Jones (B'nai Brith), founder of B'nai Brith in 1843
- Henry Jones (baker) (1812–1891), creator of self-raising flour
- Henry Jones (entrepreneur) (1862–1926), Australian entrepreneur
- Henry Uliomereyon Jones, better known as Dr. Henry Jones, convicted of a fraudulent Ponzi scheme through Tri Energy

== Military ==
- Sir Henry Jones of Oxfordshire (died 1673), English army officer
- Henry Mitchell Jones (1831–1916), Irish soldier

== Politics and law ==
- Henry Jones (lawyer) (died 1592), Welsh lawyer and clergyman
- Henry Jones (Upper Canada politician) (1790–1860), politician in Upper Canada
- Henry Frank Jones (1920–1964), Canadian politician
- Sir Henry Haydn Jones (1863–1950), Welsh Liberal Party politician, MP 1910–1945
- Henry Jones (MP) (died 1792), British member of parliament for Devizes, 1780–1784
- Henry Cox Jones (1821–1913), Alabama politician
- Sir Henry Jones (MP for Carmarthenshire) (?1532–1586), Welsh MP for Carmarthenshire, Cardiganshire and Old Sarum

== Science and social science ==
- Henry Bence Jones (1813–1873), English physician and chemist
- Sir Henry Jones (philosopher) (1852–1922), Welsh philosopher and academic

== Sports and games ==
- Henry Jones (second baseman) (1857–1955), 19th-century baseball second baseman
- Henry Jones (pitcher), 19th-century baseball pitcher
- Henry Jones (cricketer) (born 1989), English cricketer
- Henry Jones (writer) (1831–1899), authority on card games and tennis; wrote under the pseudonym Cavendish
- Henry Jones (American football) (born 1967), National Football League defensive back

== Others ==
- Henry Jones (bishop) (c. 1605–1681), Church of Ireland bishop of Clogher and then of Meath
- Henry Cadman Jones (1818–1902), English law reporter
- Henry Church Jones (1870–1941), Church in Wales priest
- Henry Lee Jones (born 1963), American criminal, spree killer and suspected serial killer

== Characters ==
- Henry Jones, Jr., better known as Indiana Jones
- Henry Jones, Sr., the father of Indiana Jones
- Henry Jones III, birth name of Mutt Williams, Indiana Jones' son

== Companies ==
- Henry Jones IXL, a manufacturer of jams, conserves and sauces in Australia

== See also ==
- Harry Jones (disambiguation)
