= Harry Jones =

Harry or Harrison Jones may refer to:

== Sports ==
=== Association football (soccer) ===
- Harry Jones (footballer, born 1891) (1891–1947), English international football player
- Harry Jones (footballer, born 1911) (1911–1957), English football player
- Harry Jones (Welsh footballer) (fl. 1911–1915), Welsh football player for Port Vale
- Harrison Jones (English footballer) (born 2004), English football midfielder

=== Rugby union ===
- Harry Jones (rugby union, born 1878) (1878–1930), Welsh international rugby union player
- Harry Jones (rugby union, born 1989), Canadian international rugby union player
- Harry Jones (rugby union, born 1992), New Zealand rugby union player for Waikato
- Harry Jones (rugby union, born 1995), Australian professional rugby union player for the New South Wales Waratahs

=== Other sports ===
- Harry Jones (American football) (1945-2016), American football player who played for the Philadelphia Eagles from 1967 to 1970
- Harry Jones (Australian footballer, born 1911) (1911–1997), Australian rules football player for Collingwood
- Harry Jones (Australian footballer, born 1999), Australian rules football player for Hawthorn
- Harrison Jones (Australian footballer) (born 2001), Australian rules football player for Essendon
- Harry Jones (cricketer, born 1922) (1922–1995), Welsh cricketer
- Harry Jones (sailor) (1895–1956), Canadian sailor who competed in the 1932 Olympics

== Others ==
- Harry Edward Jones (1843–1925), British civil engineer
- Harry Thomson Jones (1925–2007), British racehorse trainer
- Harry Wild Jones (1859–1935), American architect
- Harry Jones, a minor character in Raymond Chandler's The Big Sleep
- Harry Longueville Jones (1806–1870), archaeologist
- Harry Jones (British Army officer) (1791–1866), British general
- Harry Jones (Canadian politician) (1840–1936), Welsh-born prospector and political figure in British Columbia
- Harry Jones (Oklahoma politician) (1859–1938), British-born American politician
- Harry Clary Jones (1865–1916), American physical chemist and professor of chemistry
- Harry Gwynne Jones (1918–1985), British psychologist
- Harry Jones, Tracy Beaker and The Dumping Ground character

== See also ==
- Harold Jones (disambiguation)
- Henry Jones (disambiguation)
