= Harold Jones =

Harold Jones may refer to:

- E. Harold Jones (1877–1911), British artist and excavator
- Harold W. Jones (1877–1958), director of the US Army Medical Library
- Harold Spencer Jones (1890–1960), British astronomer
- Harold Jones (sprinter) (born 1900), American sprinter, 2nd in the 220 yards at the 1922 USA Outdoor Track and Field Championships
- Harold Jones (artist) (1904–1992), British artist, illustrator and author of children's books
- Harold Jones (rugby union, born 1904) (1904–1986), English rugby union player
- Harold Jones (murderer) (1906–1971), Welsh child killer
- Harold Jones (rugby, born 1907) (1907–1955), rugby union and rugby league footballer of the 1920s and 1930s
- Griffith Jones (actor) (Harold Jones, 1909–2007), British stage and television actor
- Harold Jones (footballer) (1933–2003), English football defender
- Harold Jones (drummer) (born 1940), known for his work with other jazz musicians such as Count Basie
- Harold V. Jones II (born 1969), American politician in Georgia
- Harold Jones (bishop), American prelate of the Episcopal Church

== See also ==
- Harold E. Jones Child Study Center, a research center affiliated with the University of California at Berkeley
- Harry Jones (disambiguation)
