= Effects of early-life exposures to anesthesia on the brain =

The effects of early-life exposures to anesthesia on the brain in humans are controversial. Evidence from nonhuman primate research suggests significant developmental neurotoxicity and long-term social impairment, with a dose–response relationship where repeated exposures cause a more severe impact than single ones. Research in humans has not found conclusive clinical evidence of cognitive impairment; however, systematic reviews imply the possibility of greater behavioural impairments in children exposed to anesthesia before the age of three than control subjects.

Debate exists over the real-world consequences of these impacts. The effect size of early-life anesthesia exposure appears small, and may or may not be practically relevant. In 2016, the United States Food and Drug Administration issued a communication cautioning about "repeated or lengthy" exposure to general anesthetic prior to age three and suggested clinicians and caregivers weigh the risks and benefits of surgical procedures longer than three hours in this population.

== Preclinical evidence ==
Studies in preclinical models have demonstrated that rodents and nonhuman primates that were exposed to general anesthesia in infancy developed neurodevelopmental problems later in life. Particularly in nonhuman primates, studies of exposures to anesthesia in infancy indicate that early-life anesthesia is associated with long-term changes in social behaviors, elevated anxiety and/or inhibition. At the cellular level, the exposure of rodents and nonhuman primates to anesthesia during infancy causes developmental neurotoxicity, including widespread neuronal and glial apoptosis, and deficits in synapse and mitochondria structures and functions. Exposures to anesthetics in early life can also cause genomic and epigenomic changes, including reduced levels of proteins that regulate the development and function of neurons, such as BDNF and immediate early genes. Multiple exposures to anesthesia have been found to confer greater deficits in neurotoxicity, cognition and social behavior than single exposures.

Nearly all anesthetics that are antagonists of NMDA receptors and/or agonists of GABA_{A} receptors have been shown to cause developmental neurotoxicity and alter cognition and/or behavior. Neurotoxicity in rodents has been shown for inhalant anesthetics—such as sevoflurane, isoflurane, and desflurane—as well as intravenous anesthetics like ketamine and propofol. Studies in nonhuman primates have shown that neurotoxic and cognitive or behavioral effects caused by general anesthetics may be reduced by co-administration of agents such as dexmedetomidine, lithium, and pramipexole.

=== Limitations of preclinical studies ===
Many preclinical neurological findings are limited in their translatability to humans due to differences in brain complexity and development between humans and rodents, as well as the difficulty in controlling and monitoring rodent physiology for safety during exposures.

== Clinical evidence ==
Studies on the effects of anesthesia exposures in early life on the mental and physical health of children have used both retrospective cohort study and prospective cohort study designs.

The tools used to track changes in neurodevelopment vary among studies. Some query overall neurodevelopment, others focus on academic performance, and yet others focus on behavioral impairments such as attention deficit hyperactivity disorder (ADHD) or autism. Common tools used to track neurodevelopment changes have included the Bayley Scales of Infant and Toddler Development, Wechsler Preschool and Primary Scale of Intelligence, Full Scale Intelligence Quotient, standardized test scores, and Preschool Language Scale, as well as behavioral observations by parents and teachers.

There is not conclusive clinical evidence that a single, brief anesthetic exposure in children under the age of three is associated with a significant risk for neurodevelopment issues such as development of a learning disability, or deficits in academic performance or intelligence quotient. However, a systematic review and meta-analysis of prospective clinical studies found that while Full Scale Intelligence Quotient was not affected by a single anesthetic exposure, a single exposure to anesthesia before age three was associated with significant increases in parental reports of behavioral problems.

Several retrospective studies have found that multiple exposures to anesthesia before the age of three are associated with an increased risk for worse academic achievement or behavioral disability in children who have undergone multiple exposures to anesthesia. Retrospective studies of early-life exposures to anesthesia have also reported an increased risk for behavioral problems or attention deficit hyperactivity disorder after multiple exposures to anesthesia before age three.

=== Limitations of clinical studies ===
Due to the opportunistic nature of research in humans, it is not possible to separate out the influence of pre-existing health conditions necessitating surgery and the impacts of surgery from the effects of anesthesia alone on neurodevelopmental outcomes in clinical studies.

The diversity of neurodevelopment and behavior assessment tools used across studies can complicate direct comparisons between studies. Likewise, clinical diagnostic tools used may not be sensitive enough or capture the affected aspects of behavior, as in the cases reporting "non-attainment of score", which may include children who are unable to sit for a test due to behavioral or neurodevelopmental problems. Clinical studies using parental reports of behavior as an outcome measure may also be subject to bias from parental attitudes related to the safety of anesthesia; some prospective studies on general versus regional anesthesia have dealt with this source of bias through blinding parents to which treatment their child received.

== Controversy ==
There is an ongoing debate about the relevance of the small effect sizes found in the clinical literature of early-life anesthesia exposures. One perspective is that although children exposed to anesthesia before age three may show deficits in neurodevelopmental outcomes, these deficits often fall within the normal range of outcomes and thus may not indicate a significant risk for single anesthetic exposures in early life. Another perspective is that although effects of single exposures on individuals may be small, a small increase in adverse outcomes for the 500,000 to 1 million children exposed to anesthesia in early childhood in the U.S. each year could still represent a significant shift at a population level.

There is also debate regarding the relative risk of anesthesia by the age of exposure across the first few years of life. The few studies that have directly explored the relevance of the age of anesthesia exposure on neurodevelopment and behavioral outcomes do not indicate a worse effect of exposures from ages 0-2 compared to 2-4 years of age, and in some cases indicate the opposite effect.

== US-FDA policy recommendations ==
In light of the preclinical and clinical literature, in 2016, the U.S. Food and Drug Administration issued a communication containing a warning that "repeated or lengthy use of general anesthetic and sedation drugs during surgeries or procedures in children younger than three years or in pregnant women during their third trimester may affect the development of children’s brains." The FDA continued on in the communication to state that it was unlikely for a single, brief exposure to anesthesia to have negative learning or behavior effects, and recommended that health care professionals, patients, and caregivers weigh the benefits and risks of procedures requiring anesthetic exposures greater than three hours before proceeding. In response to this communication by the FDA, controversy has arisen among the pediatric anesthesiology community regarding whether this warning could put patient health at risk by influencing the delay of necessary procedures. Others have pointed out that because the available literature in 2016 was skewed toward preclinical data and ambiguous findings in retrospective clinical studies, the FDA recommendation may have been prematurely conclusive.
