= Effective Perl Programming =

Textbook covering the Perl programming language

Effective Perl Programming

Effective Perl Programming, sometimes known as the Shiny Ball Book by Perl programmers, is an intermediate to advanced text by Joseph N. Hall covering the Perl programming language. Randal L. Schwartz contributed a foreword and technical editing.

Effective Perl Programming follows the numbered "rules" format begun in Scott Meyers' Effective C++. A small number of errors were corrected in the 2nd and 4th printings.

An expanded second edition (ISBN 0321496949), Effective Perl Programming: Ways to Write Better, More Idiomatic Perl, 2/E. by Hall, Joshua A McAdams, and brian d foy was published in 2010 by Pearson.
