= Advanced Perl Programming =

Book about advanced utilization of the Perl programming language

- Author: Sriram Srinivasan
- Language: English
- Subject: Perl Programming
- Genre: Computing
- Publisher: O'Reilly Media
- Publication date: 1997
- Publication place: United States
- ISBN: 1-56592-220-4

Advanced Perl Programming is a technical book on the Perl programming language, authored by Sriram Srinivasan and first published in 1997 by O'Reilly Media. The book focuses on advanced concepts and techniques used in production-level Perl development, offering insight into the design and implementation of real-world Perl applications.

A second edition of the book was published in 2005, authored by Simon Cozens and edited by Allison Randal. Unlike the first edition, the second edition features a different set of advanced programming techniques, with a stronger emphasis on practical use cases in modern Perl development.

Both editions are independent in content and are intended to serve experienced Perl programmers seeking to deepen their understanding of the language.

Related books include Programming Perl, Perl Cookbook, and Perl Hacks.

== Impact and Reception ==
Upon its release, Advanced Perl Programming was recognized for its in-depth exploration of Perl's advanced features. Eric S. Raymond, writing for Linux Journal, described the book as "an astonishingly sustained tour de force" and praised its insightful commentary on Perl's design and internals. He noted that the author "illuminates Perl by connecting it to an impressively broad range of issues in computer science and programming language design"

The book achieved commercial success, selling over 120,000 copies and being translated into seven languages, including Simplified Chinese, Czech, French, Japanese, Polish, German, and Traditional Chinese

The second edition, released in 2005, was well-received for updating the content to reflect the evolving Perl landscape. Simon Cozens, the author of the second edition, aimed to address the shift in Perl programming practices, focusing on integrating existing modules from CPAN rather than building components from scratch . Reviewers appreciated the practical approach; Rocco Caputo, lead developer of POE, commended the book for guiding readers through Perl's extensive module ecosystem, enabling them to apply the best tools for various tasks

Charles Stross called Advanced Perl Programming's sections on networking and object-oriented programming "well-nigh indispensable". Eric S. Raymond called Sriram Srinivasan's commentary on the Perl language "uniformly intelligent, incisive and tasteful". Donald Bryson of Network Computing magazine called the book "full of useful information, well written, beautifully set, and technically accurate".
