= Barbara Stoddard Burks =

American psychologist

- Born: December 22, 1902; New York City, New York
- Died: May 25, 1943 (aged 40); New York City, New York
- Education: Stanford University
- Known for: Heritability of IQ
- Spouse: Herman Ramsperger (m. 1927–1932)
- Awards: General Education Board Fellowship (1935); Guggenheim Fellowship (1943)
- Scientific career
- Fields: Psychometrics; Behavior genetics
- Workplaces: University of California, Berkeley Institute of Child Welfare; Carnegie Institution for Science; Columbia University
- Thesis: The relative influence of nature and nurture upon mental development: a comparative study of foster parent-foster child resemblance and true parent-true child resemblance (1928)
- Doctoral advisor: Lewis Terman
- Notable students: Claude Shannon

Barbara Stoddard Burks (December 22, 1902—May 25, 1943) was an American psychologist known for her research on the nature-nurture debate as it pertained to intelligence and other human traits. She has been credited with "...pioneer[ing] the statistical techniques which continue to ground the trenchant nature/nurture debates about intelligence in American psychology."

== Early life and education ==
Burks was born on December 22, 1902, in New York City, New York, to Jesse and Frances Burks. When she was a child, her family moved to many different locations before eventually settling in California. There, she started her undergraduate studies at the University of California, Berkeley, where she worked with Edward C. Tolman. Under Tolman's supervision, she became skilled at conducting statistical analyses based on his research on rat breeding. In her senior year, she transferred to Stanford University, where she began studying under Lewis Terman. She received her bachelor's degree from Stanford in 1924. Terman was so impressed with her performance as an undergraduate that he recommended that she immediately enroll in graduate school. She then did exactly that, enrolling in Stanford's Ph.D. program in psychology, where she worked with Terman on his "Genetic Studies of Genius" project, which tracked intellectually gifted children through their adolescence.

== Career ==
In the early 1930s, Burks worked as a consulting psychologist at various schools in the city of Pasadena, California. From 1933 to 1935, she worked at the Institute of Child Welfare at the University of California, Berkeley. In 1935, she was a member of a Social Science Research Council committee, on which she was tasked with compiling research on personality traits relative to competition and cooperation. Also in 1935, she was given a fellowship by the General Education Board to study psychology in Europe, where she collaborated with Jean Piaget, Carl Jung, and Charlotte Buhler. In 1936, she returned to the United States, where she was named a research associate at the Carnegie Institute of Washington at Cold Spring Harbor. While there, she was tasked with analyzing the utility of human pedigrees in the institute's Genetics Record Office. In 1938, Gordon Allport, the president of the American Psychological Association at the time, appointed her as the first secretary. She was later made chairperson of the newly formed American Psychological Association Committee on Displaced Foreign Psychologists. She also supervised Claude Shannon during a summer research program at the Institute in 1939, where Shannon conducted the research on genetic algebra that led to his dissertation. Also in 1939, she was named the chairwoman of an "abnormal human characters" section meeting at the Seventh International Congress of Genetics, making her one of only two women to be so named. She became a research associate at Columbia University in 1940. In 1943, she received a Guggenheim Fellowship for 1943–1944, but she died before her fellowship could begin. After her death, she was named to the 1944 edition of American Men of Science.

== Research ==
Burks is particularly known for her 1928 Ph.D. dissertation, which examined the relative effects of genetics and environment on the IQ scores of foster children in California. This dissertation, completed at Stanford University, has been described as "a pioneering study in the field of behavioural genetics". Her dissertation concluded that between 75 and 80% of variation in IQ scores was due to genetic factors. The data would be used by Sewall Wright for path analysis of heritability issues. The study was cited favorably by Arthur Jensen in support of his hereditarian views, but it has been criticized for having a biased sample and for its limited measurements of environmental factors.

While working as a graduate student at Berkeley, she was one of Terman's research assistants on his "Genetic Studies of Genius" project from 1924 to 1929, and served as the lead author of its third volume, The Promise of Youth: Follow-up Studies of a Thousand Gifted Children, which was published in 1930. These studies followed up a group of children who had been identified as being highly intelligent early in life, and found that they were still exceptionally intelligent many years later.

At the time of her death, she had recently received a Guggenheim Fellowship to study identical twins adopted apart.

== Personal life ==
Burks married Herman Ramsperger, a National Research Fellow in chemistry at Stanford, in 1927; they remained married until his death in 1932. In 1943, she became engaged to longtime friend Robert Cook, but she died before they could be married.

=== Death ===
Burks, then a research associate at Columbia University, died on May 25, 1943, when she "either fell or jumped to her death from the George Washington Bridge" in New York City, New York. King et al. (1996) cite letters in the Terman archive to the effect that "She had also become engaged to marry Robert Cook but, according to her mother, had continually struggled with depression following a "severe nervous breakdown" in 1942 (Burks, F. W., 1943)." (Paul J. Nahin has suggested that Vannevar Bush's decision to close the eugenics program at Cold Spring Harbor in 1940, may have caused depression, which then led to suicide.)

== Selected works ==
- Whipple, Guy M., ed. (1928). Nature and Nurture, Part I: Their Influence upon Intelligence. Twenty-Seventh Yearbook of the National Society for the Study of Education. Vol. 27. Bloomington, IL: Public School Publishing Company. Chapters:
  - (with Truman L. Kelley) "Statistical hazards in nature-nurture investigations", pp. 9–38.
  - "The relative influence of nature and nurture upon mental development: A comparative study of foster parent–foster child resemblance and true parent–true child resemblance", pp. 219–316.
- Burks, Barbara S.; Jensen, Dortha W.; Terman, Lewis M. (1930). The Promise of Youth: Follow-up Studies of a Thousand Gifted Children. Genetic Studies of Genius. Vol. 3. Stanford, CA: Stanford University Press.
- Burks, Barbara S. (1938). "On the relative contributions of nature and nurture to average group differences in intelligence". Proceedings of the National Academy of Sciences. 24 (7): 276–282. doi:10.1073/pnas.24.7.276.
- Burks, Barbara S.; Roe, Anne (1949). "Studies of identical twins reared apart" (PDF). Psychological Monographs: General and Applied. 63 (5): i–62. doi:10.1037/h0093608.
