= Joseph N. Hall =

American author, programming consultant, and software developer (born 1966)

Joseph N. Hall (born January 8, 1966) is an American author, software developer and programming consultant. Hall is known in the Perl programming community as the author of the book Effective Perl Programming with Randal L. Schwartz, and as a contributor of software to the CPAN.

In the mid-1970s, Hall received US media coverage as a child prodigy and as a survivor of childhood acute lymphoblastic leukemia.

== Bibliography ==
- Effective Perl Programming, ISBN 0-201-41975-0
- Effective Perl Programming, irregularly-appearing column in ;login: (the magazine of USENIX/SAGE)

== Interviews ==
- Tomorrow with Tom Snyder, television interview, 1975
- ABC Evening News, news feature, November 21, 1975
