= Programming Perl =

1991 book by Larry Wall

- First edition
- Author: Larry Wall, Randal L. Schwartz,
- Publisher: O'Reilly Media
- Publication date: 1991
- Media type: Print, Ebook
- Pages: 1184
- ISBN: 978-0-596-00492-7 (print), 978-1-4493-9890-3 (ebook)

Programming Perl, best known as the Camel Book among programmers, is a book about writing programs using the Perl programming language, revised as several editions (1991–2012) to reflect major language changes since Perl version 4. Editions have been co-written by the creator of Perl, Larry Wall, along with Randal L. Schwartz, then Tom Christiansen and then Jon Orwant. Published by O'Reilly Media, the book is considered the canonical reference work for Perl programmers. With over 1,000 pages, the various editions contain complete descriptions of each Perl language version and its interpreter. Examples range from trivial code snippets to the highly complex expressions for which Perl is widely known. The camel book editions are also noted for being written in an approachable and humorous style.

== History ==
The first edition, which gained the nickname "the pink camel" due to its pink spine, was originally published in January 1991 and covered version 4 of the Perl language. It was the work of Larry Wall and Randal L. Schwartz. The second edition, published in August 1996, included updates for the release of Perl 5, among them references, objects, packages and other modern programming constructs. This edition was written from scratch by the original authors and Tom Christiansen. In July 2000, the third edition of Programming Perl was published. This version was again rewritten, this time by Wall, Christiansen and Jon Orwant, and covered the Perl 5.6 language. The fourth edition constitutes a major update and rewrite of the book for Perl version 5.14, and improves the coverage of Unicode usage in Perl. The fourth edition was published in February 2012. This edition is written by Tom Christiansen, brian d foy, Larry Wall and Jon Orwant.

Programming Perl has also been made available electronically by O'Reilly, both through its inclusion in various editions of The Perl CD Bookshelf and through the "Safari" service (a subscription-based website containing technical ebooks). The publisher offers online a free sample of Chapter 18 of the third edition and the Chapter 1 of the fourth edition as well as the complete set of code examples in the book (third edition) . O'Reilly maintains a trademark on the use of a camel in association with Perl, but allows noncommercial use.

== Editions ==
- First edition (1991; 482 pages; covers Perl 4; ISBN 978-0-937175-64-4)
- Second edition (1996; 670 pages; covers Perl 5.003; ISBN 978-1-56592-149-8)
- Third edition (2000; 1104 pages; covers Perl 5.6; ISBN 978-0-596-00027-1)
- Fourth edition (2012; 1184 pages; covers Perl 5.14; ISBN 978-0-596-00492-7)

The second edition of the book was the best-selling book in the O'Reilly Media catalog in 1996, and one of the top 100 selling books in any category at Borders in 1996.

In 1998 the second edition was the 58th bestselling book at Amazon, just ahead of Bjarne Stroustrup's The C++ Programming Language third edition.

== See also ==
- Some related books published by O'Reilly are: Learning Perl, Intermediate Perl, and Mastering Perl.
- The "Three Virtues of a Programmer" are three entries in the Glossary of the 2nd edition of the book, which have been popularized outside the Perl programming community.
