= Perl Cookbook =

Book by Tom Christiansen

- Second edition
- Author: Tom Christiansen; Nathan Torkington
- Language: English
- Publisher: O'Reilly Media
- Publication date: August 1998
- Publication place: United States
- Pages: 964
- ISBN: 1-56592-243-3 (First edition); ISBN 0-596-00313-7 (Second edition)

The Perl Cookbook, ISBN 0-596-00313-7, is a book containing solutions to common short tasks in Perl. Each chapter covers a particular topic area ("Strings", "Ties, Objects, and Classes", "CGI") and is divided into around a dozen recipes each on a particular problem ("Reversing A String By Word Or Character", "Accessing Overridden Methods", "Managing Cookies"). Each recipe has four parts: "Problem", "Solution", "Discussion", and "See Also".

The Perl Cookbook is written by Tom Christiansen and Nathan Torkington, and published by O'Reilly. The Perl Cookbook inspired the PLEAC (Programming Language Examples Alike Cookbook) website, which translated the code snippets in the Perl Cookbook into other languages: Python, Ruby, Guile, Tcl, Java, and beyond. O'Reilly went on to publish other Cookbooks inspired by the Perl Cookbook's format, including Java Cookbook, Python Cookbook, CSS Cookbook, and PHP Cookbook.

Some related books are Learning Perl and Advanced Perl Programming.

== Reception ==
The Perl Cookbook has been referred to as "the definitive Perl book", "the ultimate Perl Grabbag", and "an essential book for the advanced development of Perl skills".

== Editions ==
- First edition (1998; 794 pages; ISBN 1-56592-243-3)
- Second edition (2003; 964 pages; ISBN 0-596-00313-7)
