= Web Techniques =

- Web Techniques logo
- Editor: Amit Asaravala
- Categories: Computer magazines
- Frequency: Monthly
- First issue: February 1996
- Final issue: February 2002
- Company: CMP Media
- Country: United States
- Based in: San Francisco. CA
- Language: English
- Website: www.webtechniques.com
- ISSN: 1086-556X

Web Techniques (ISSN 1086-556X) was a monthly magazine published in the United States by CMP Technology. It covered topics aimed at web developers. It ran from February 1996 until its last issue in February 2002, after which it changed formats and titles, becoming New Architect.

== Columns ==
- Programming with Perl, by Randal L. Schwartz
- At Your Server, by Jim Jagielski
- Java@Work, by Al Williams

== Awards ==
- Maggie Award, Best Signed Editorial in a trade publication, 2001
