= Learning Perl =

Tutorial book for the Perl programming language

- First edition
- Author: Randal L. Schwartz
- Publisher: O'Reilly Media
- Publication date: 1993
- Media type: Print, Ebook
- Pages: 394
- ISBN: 978-1-4919-5432-4 (print), ISBN 978-1-4919-5426-3 (ebook)

Learning Perl, also known as the llama book, is a tutorial book for the Perl programming language, and is published by O'Reilly Media. The first edition (1993) was authored solely by Randal L. Schwartz, and covered Perl 4. All subsequent editions have covered Perl 5. The second (1997) edition was coauthored with Tom Christiansen and the third (2001) edition was coauthored with Tom Phoenix. The fourth (2005), fifth (2008), sixth (2011), seventh (2016), and eighth (2021) editions were written by Schwartz, Phoenix, and brian d foy. According to the 5th edition of the book, previous editions have sold more than 500,000 copies.

Unlike Programming Perl, this book is aimed at computer programmers new to Perl. The publisher offers a complete set of code examples presented in the 3rd Edition book.

Schwartz selected the world of The Flintstones for the examples in this book, giving rise to the somewhat frequent use of Fred and Barney as metasyntactic variables, rather than the classic foo and bar.

== Reactions ==
Brad Morrey, reviewing the book for InfoWorld, praises the book for its "casual, first person style" and concludes that it "is a terrific introduction to the language that will serve as a good reference book once you have read it through." In his Linux Journal review of Perl in a Nutshell, Jan Rooijackers recommends that "If you are totally new to programming and you want to learn Perl, the book Learning Perl ... might be a better place to start."

Discussing Schwartz' conviction, the New York Times noted that "Much of the Internet's World Wide Web has been built by programmers who got their start by reading his "Programming Perl" and "Learning Perl" books." Also reflecting in that case in Principles of Information Systems Security, Gurpreet Dhillon calls Learning Perl, "the definitive Perl instruction guide." In Perl Medic, author Peter Scott calls the book "the most common tutorial for learning Perl", but then criticizes its omission of hard references.

=== Later works ===
In 2003, Schwartz published a follow-up to Learning Perl titled Learning Perl Objects, References & Modules. It picks up where Learning Perl left off. In 2005, Learning Perl Objects, References & Modules was updated by Schwartz and brian d foy and re-titled Intermediate Perl which is now in its second edition as of 2012. Mastering Perl, the third book in the trilogy and follow-up to Intermediate Perl, was first published in July 2007 and is also in a second edition as of 2014.

== Editions ==
- First edition (Nov. 1993; 274 pages; ISBN 1-56592-042-2)
- Second edition (Jul. 1997; 300 pages; covers Perl 5.004; ISBN 1-56592-284-0)
- Third edition (Jul. 2001; 330 pages; covers Perl 5.6; ISBN 0-596-00132-0)
- Fourth edition (Jul. 2005; 312 pages; covers Perl 5.8; ISBN 0-596-10105-8)
- Fifth edition (Jul. 2008; 348 pages; covers Perl 5.10; ISBN 0-596-52010-7)
- Sixth edition (Jun. 2011; 390 pages; covers Perl 5.14; ISBN 1-4493-0358-7)
- Seventh edition (Oct. 2016; 394 pages; covers Perl 5.24; ISBN 1-4919-5432-9)
- Eighth edition (Aug. 2021; 398 pages; covers Perl 5.34; ISBN 978-1-49-209495-1)
