= Harold E. Jones Child Study Center =

Institution at UC Berkeley

Coordinates: 37°51′56.65″N 122°15′51.53″W

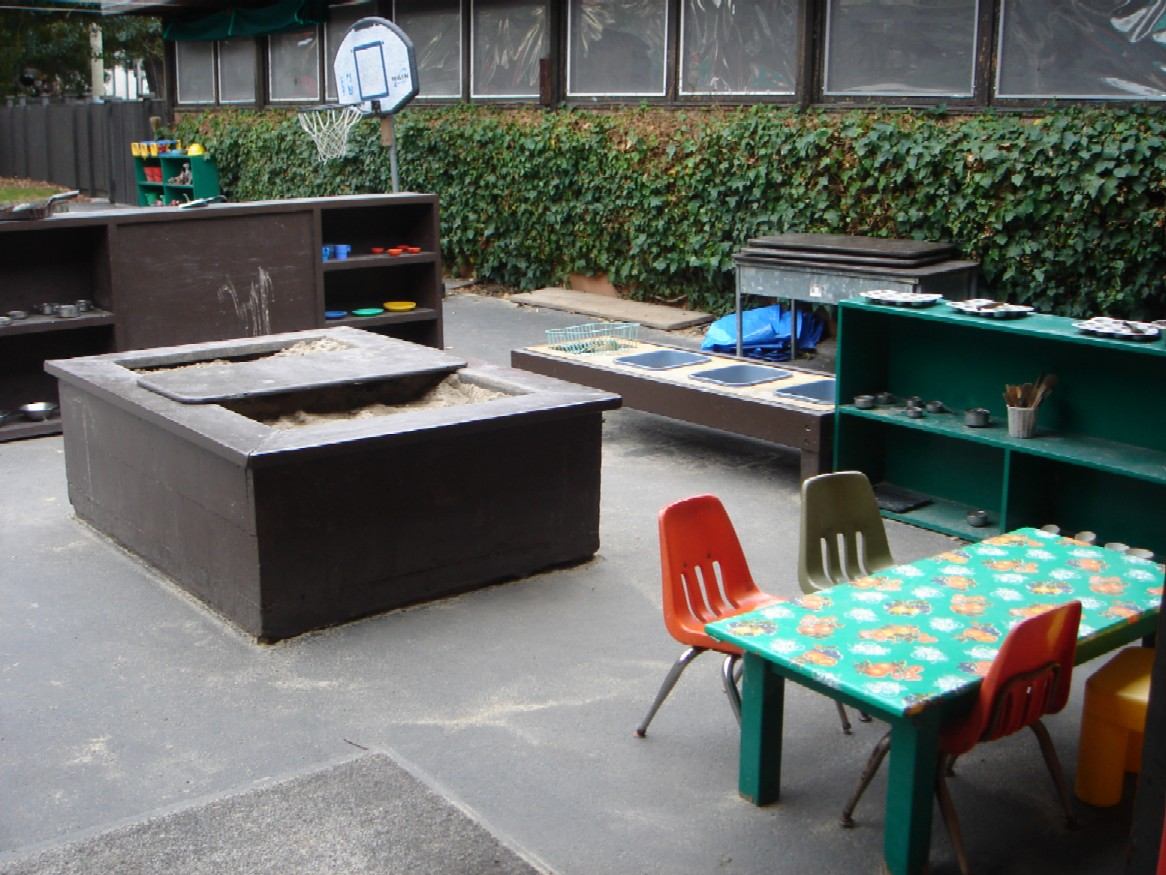
Outdoor Sand Kitchen

The Harold E. Jones Child Study Center is a research and educational institution for young children at the University of California, Berkeley. It is one of the oldest continuously running centers for the study of children in the country. The Jones Child Study Center has a special relationship with the Institute of Human Development as a site for research, training and outreach to the community, parents, and teachers. The Institute of Human Development's fundamental mission is to study evolutionary, biological, psychological, social, and cultural factors that affect human development from birth through old age. Research conducted at the Institute of Human Development and the Jones Child Study Center is interdisciplinary: psychology, education, social welfare, architecture, sociology, linguistics, public health, and pediatrics. The primary audiences for the findings include scholars and parents. Faculty, postdoctoral, graduate, and undergraduate students observe and test children attending the preschool for their research projects. Undergraduate students in Early Childhood Education may also gain experience in the classrooms as teachers' assistants.

The Jones CSC preschool has an outdoor play area that is accessible virtually all day long via sliding doors and partially protected by an overhead canopy. Catherine Landreth, a former director of the school and designer of the building, worked with Joseph Esherick to create a space where the development of children would be highlighted. This included the careful planning of ceiling heights and placement of activity centers. In most other preschools, the ceilings tend to be low which emphasizes the height of adults in relation to children. Esherick and Landreth believed that a higher ceiling would shift the observers' focus from the height differential of the people occupying the space to the activities taking place. The activity centers were constructed to keep the children engaged by placing items at the child's eye level. Landreth wanted a place that did not impose learning but encouraged them to engage in activities that interests the child. According to a study on the physical environment for a child's development, crowding might be linked to psychological distress among children. The guiding philosophy behind the preschool is that a child's environment can positively affect development.

The Jones CSC is also the home to the Greater Good Science Center, which is an interdisciplinary research center concentrating on the scientific understanding of social well-being. Research from neuroscience, psychology, sociology, political science, economics, public policy, social welfare, public health, law, and organizational behavior study the social and biological roots of positive emotions and behaviors. The Greater Good Science Center's website and publications make research accessible to the general public. The Center produces a quarterly magazine, Greater Good magazine, that addresses research in the social sciences related to compassion in action.

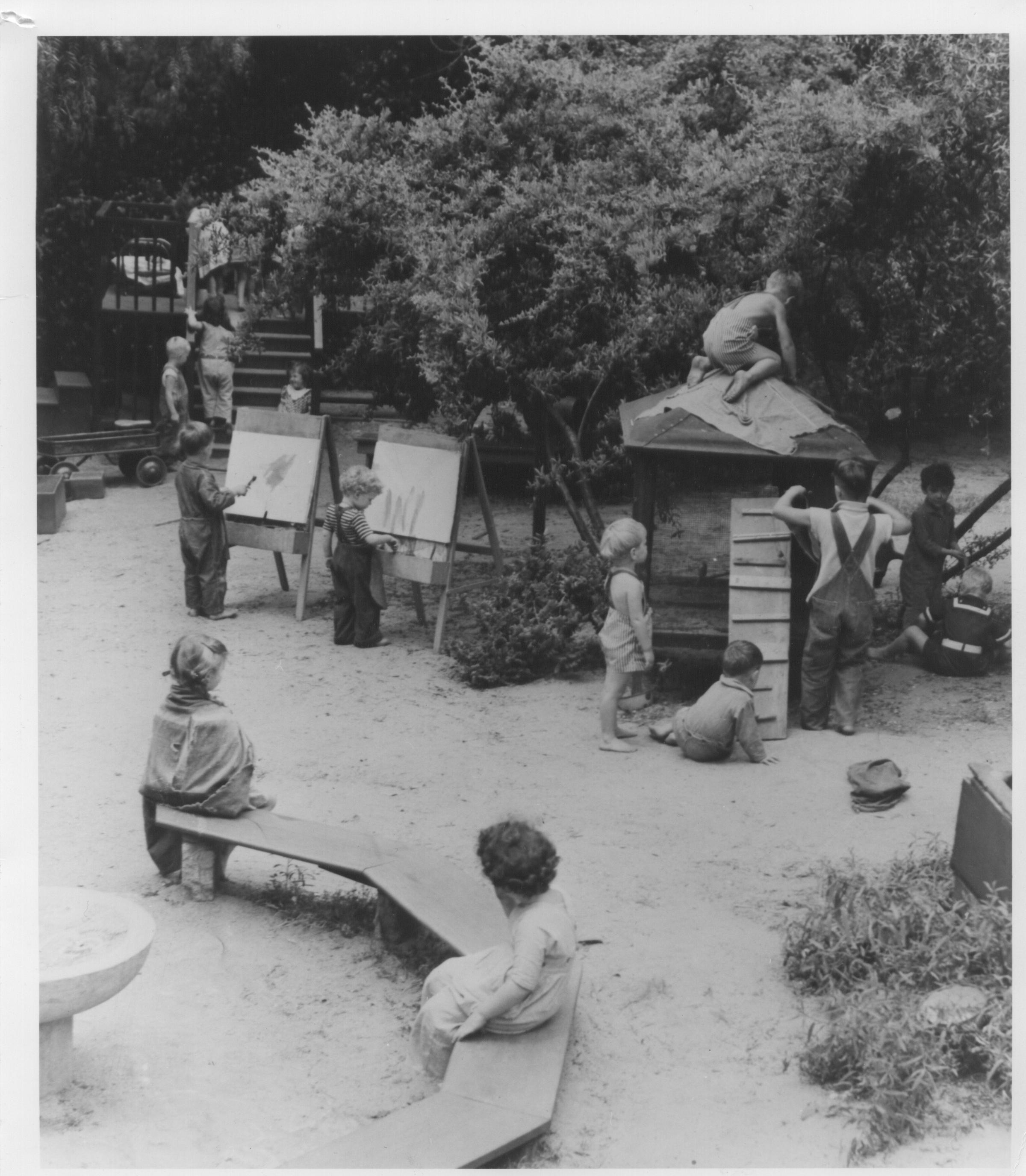
Institute of Child Welfare, Bancroft Site

== History ==
The Institute of Human Development and the Harold E. Jones Child Study Center were originally named the Institute of Child Welfare, established in 1927 by psychology professor Harold E. Jones and Rockefeller Foundation representative Lawrence Frank with support from the Laura Spelman Rockefeller Foundation. Initial research studied the factors that affect human development from the earliest stages of life. These early projects were to be longitudinal studies, following the lives of subjects over the course of their lifetime. The mission for the Institute of Child Welfare was to provide a quality nursery school for children while giving scholars and students easy access to a young population for observation and research. The Institute of Child Welfare was one of the first interdisciplinary centers in the United States for research on child development.

In 1960 the nursery school moved to its current location from the original site on Bancroft Way and was named for Harold E. Jones, the Director of the Institute of Human Development from 1935 to 1960. The current facility was designed by University of California, Berkeley architect Joseph Esherick in collaboration with Catherine Landreth, to meet the educational and physical needs of young children as well as to support research on early childhood.

== Research contributions ==
Research conducted at the Harold E. Jones Child Study Center has contributed to the field of child development. The scope of the research spans many domains of mental and social functioning. A few examples of work include:

- The development and restandardization of the Bayley Scales of Infant Development. These infant scales became the accepted standard for behavioral and motoric assessment of infants and young children. Nancy Bayley, an original member of the research staff of the institute, was the first administrator of the Jones Child Study Center.
- Longitudinal studies predicting psychological functioning in later life from early competence, socioemotional development, and profiles of personality dispositions. Examples of such longitudinal studies include the work of Jack and Jeanne Block, and Diana Baumrind.
- Research on the acquisition of language by Dan Slobin and Susan M. Ervin-Tripp. Their works address how language is acquired and the developmental interactions between linguistic skills and conceptual and social skills.
- Research on the "theory of mind," from Alison Gopnik, focuses on the development of young children's comprehension about self and others. Her work on the "theory theory" asserts that the world is understood by young children in terms of causal relations between people and objects. Furthermore, it children behave like active scientists in their approach to understand the physical and social environments around them.
- Research on the psycho-physiology of stress in middle childhood and its relation to childhood health and psychological functioning by Thomas Boyce and Abbey Alkon. Their work examines differences between children in behavioral and biological (e.g. cardiovascular, autonomic, immunologic) responses to psychological stressors in the laboratory and in response to stressful life situations such as the child's entrance to kindergarten. This work analyzes the difference between children who are vulnerable to stress and children who seem to be resilient in that they adapt well in spite of highly stressful home or school environments.
- Research on the development of mathematical thinking and the environments that support it in early childhood by Prentice Starkey and Alice Klein. Their research (a)identifies socio-economic and cross-cultural differences in the breadth and extent of children's mathematical knowledge prior to entry in elementary school, (b)studies the mathematical-learning environments of young children at home and in preschool classrooms, (c)developed a research-based mathematics curriculum for use in preschool classrooms and at home, and (d)conducted intervention research to determine the effects of their pre-kindergarten curriculum on children's readiness for school mathematics. Both low-and middle-income children's mathematical development was significantly enhanced by this curriculum relative to comparison groups of children.
- Reports by Jones CSC researchers from videotaped observations of children's play provide evidence of consistent patterns in children's language and behavior that are particular to peer play culture. Research on the classroom and playground finds that young children's play interactions and learning follow a stable and predictable progression organized into initiation, negotiation, and enactment phases.

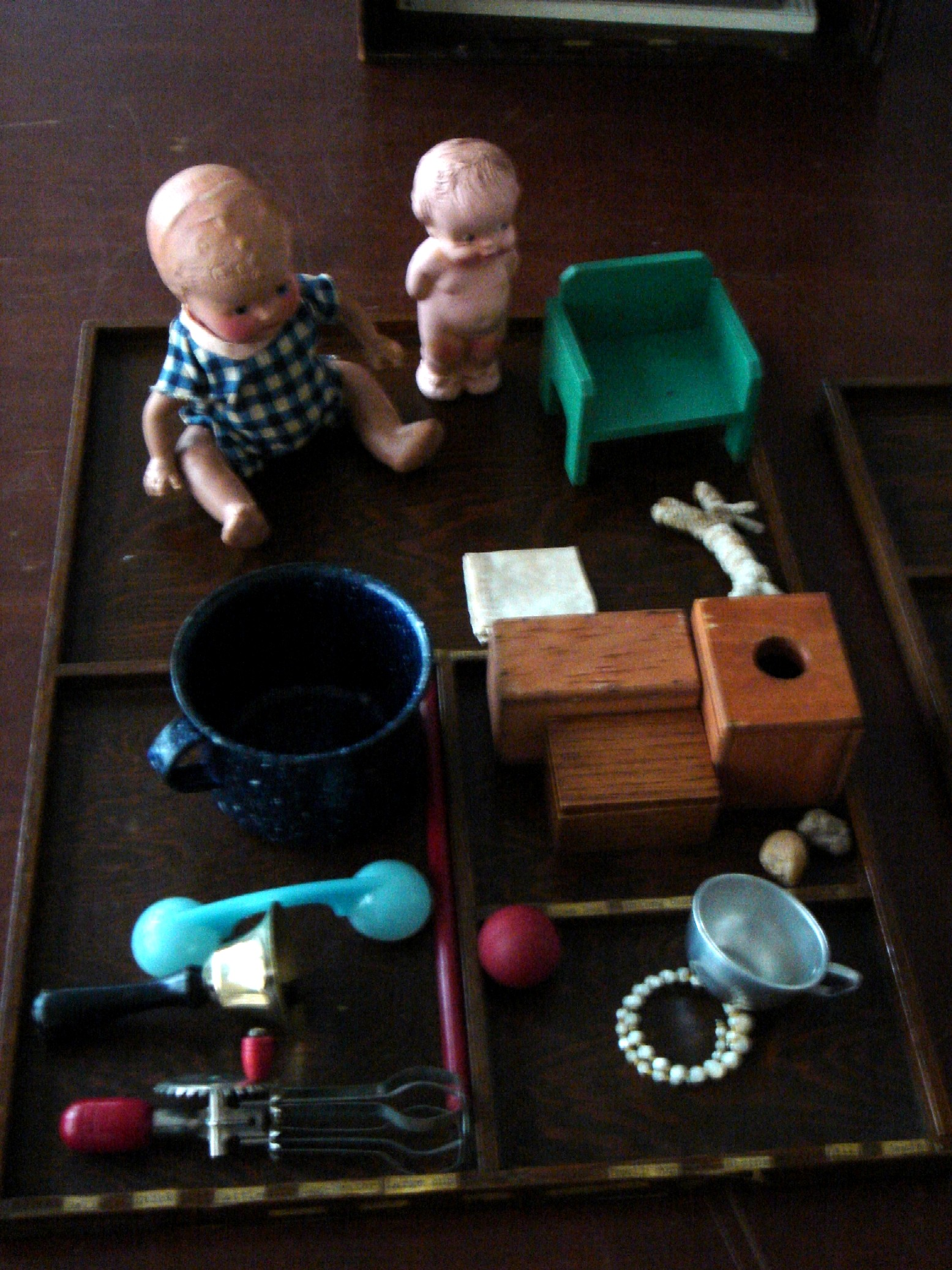
Bayley Scales of Infant Development

== Archive ==
The Jones Child Study Center holds archival materials on early child study and assessment at the University of California, Berkeley, including child observation reports from the 1930s and 40s, the original Bayley Scales Infant Development Kit, used to measure the cognitive, motor and behavioral developments of infants, and children's dictated narratives. Additional archival materials are stored at the University of California Bancroft Library.
The Jones CSC holds the Susan Solomon curated exhibition "Making Spaces for Small and Young Children to Play." This is a 20 panel (each measuring 20 inches by 48 inches) display of innovative space for children to play. This exhibition was the preliminary research for Soloman's 2005 book American Playgrounds: Revitalizing Community Space.

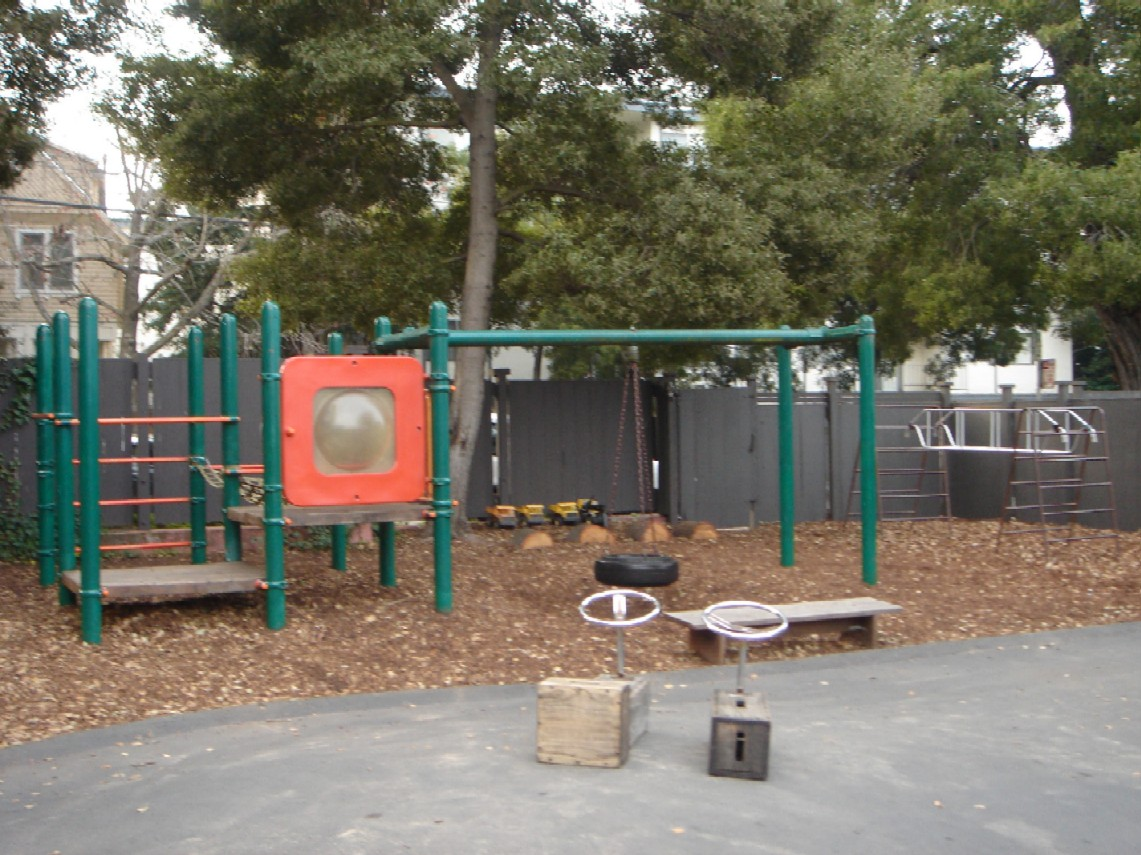
Outdoor Play Structure

== Educational contributions ==
The Harold E. Jones Child Study Center has provided educational programs for pre-school age children for more than six decades. The curriculum was originally modeled after England's nursery schools. These programs have evolved over the years to meet changing social demands and to incorporate the ever-increasing knowledge of optimal environments for the development of young children, but the commitment to serving children has remained the highest priority of the school since its inception in 1928.

Jones CSC research finds that children as young as three and four years old have their own established social patterns and ways of behaving. This peer culture is expressed most vividly during play through the primary grades and even beyond. William Corsaro, a sociologist who has studied preschool and elementary age children in classrooms from different cultures, finds two themes of this first peer group:

- a strong desire to play and "be friends" with other playmates, and
- a drive to challenge authority and gain control over their lives.

Children want to affiliate in play with each other and learn by figuring things out for themselves.

The Jones Child Study Center uses spatially defined learning centers, where small group child-generated play experiences happen in a two-level indoor playhouse, several sand-and-water stations outside, spacious and varied large motor opportunities, as well as activities in aesthetics, mathematics, science, literacy and language-all accessible both indoors and out.

Due to its architectural design, the Jones Child Study Center establishes a social ecology for learning where children, alone and in small groups, use defined indoor and outdoor areas. Each area, or ecology, is not only a particular place in the classroom or play yard, it also conveys a set of social expectations for the kind of things children will do at the site. That is why it is sometimes referred to as a social ecology. Based on Jones Child Study Center research, an ecology is defined by:

- the kinds of available materials, objects, people, space, and time,
- the kinds of activities children naturally enjoy doing with these materials in this area,
- the kinds of social interactions that occur in the area, and
- a shared history of how they played in this area in the past

An ecology encourages learning by focusing children's curiosity and initiative on specific learning experiences.

Since 1993, the University Preschool at the Jones Child Study Center has been run by the Early Childhood Education Program, which oversees seven other campus childcare sites. Currently, the program offered at the Jones CSC is a full day, year-round program for children ages 2 years nine months to 5 years old. Priority is given to University of California, Berkeley faculty and staff.
