= Brian d foy =

American computer programmer

brian d foy
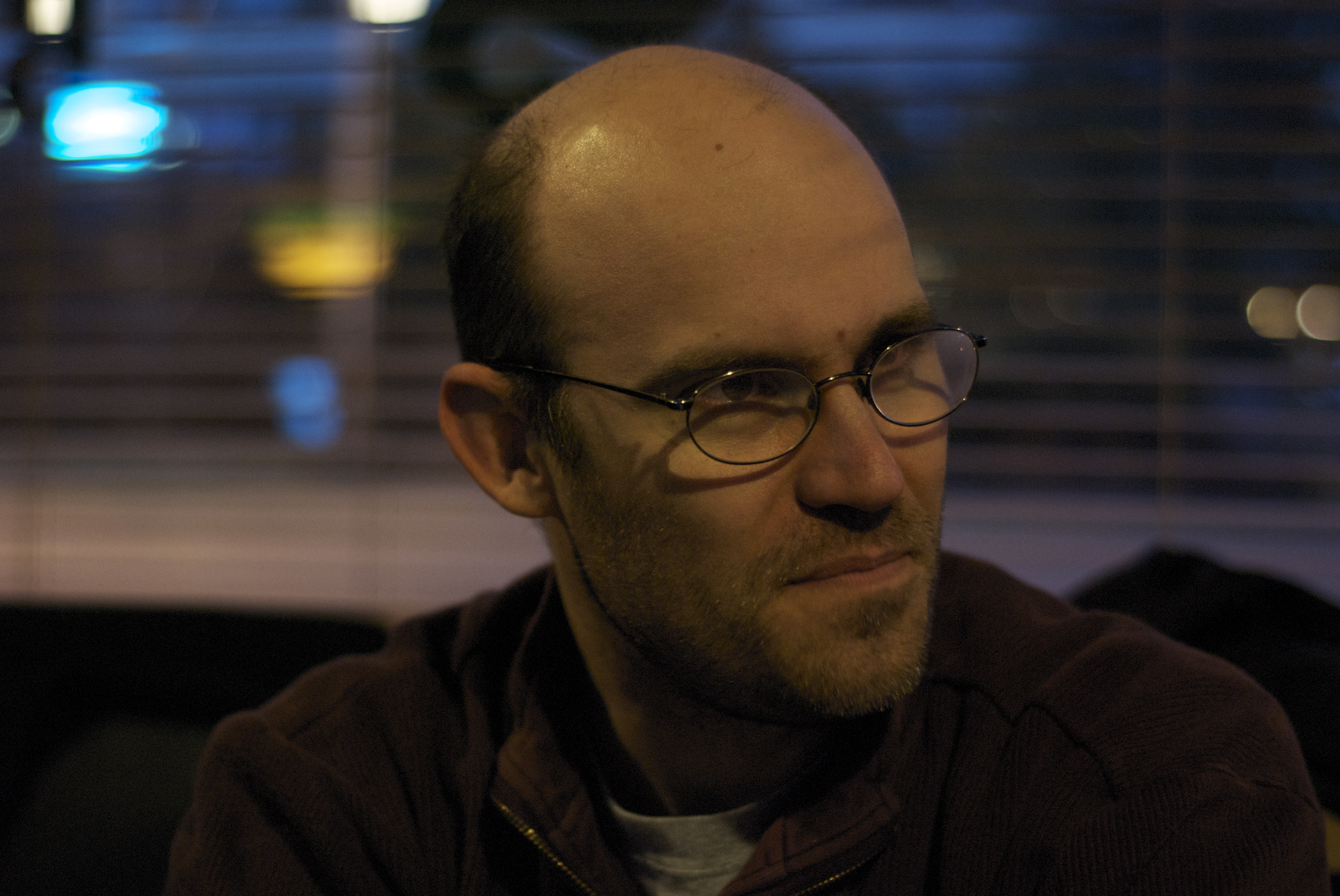
- brian d foy in 2008
- Born: United States
- Occupations: Author, computer programmer

brian d foy (stylized in lowercase) is the former publisher and editor of The Perl Review, a magazine devoted to Perl and co-author of several books on Perl including Learning Perl, Intermediate Perl and Mastering Perl. He is also the founder of Perl Mongers, the founder of the White Camel Awards, a frequent speaker at conferences including The Perl Conference and YAPC (Yet Another Perl Conference). He is the author of multiple Perl modules on CPAN and maintains the perlfaq portions of the core Perl documentation. He was a partner at Stonehenge Consulting Services from 1998 to 2009.

== PerlPowerTools ==
In 2014 he revitalized the PerlPowerTools AKA PPT project. In February 1999, Tom Christiansen announced the PerlPowerTools project to provide a unified BSD toolbox, i.e. a reimplementation of the classic Unix command set in pure Perl. Perl is the same (mostly) everywhere you go and the same programs could run the same everywhere instead of being reimplemented for each platform.

== Bibliography ==
- Learning Perl, ISBN 0-596-10105-8 (fourth edition, 2005)
- Learning Perl, ISBN 978-0-596-52010-6 (fifth edition, 2008)
- Learning Perl, ISBN 978-1-44930-358-7 (sixth edition, 2011)
- Learning Perl, ISBN 978-1-49195-432-4 (seventh edition, 2016)
- Learning Perl, ISBN 978-1-49209-495-1 (eighth edition, 2021)
- Student Workbook for Learning Perl, ISBN 0-596-00996-8 (2005)
- Learning Perl Student Workbook, ISBN 1-4493-2806-7 (second edition, 2012)
- Intermediate Perl, ISBN 0-596-10206-2 (2006)
- Intermediate Perl, ISBN 978-1-4493-9309-0 (second edition, 2012)
- Mastering Perl, ISBN 978-0-596-52724-2 (2007)
- Mastering Perl, ISBN 978-1-44939-311-3 (second edition, 2014)
- Effective Perl Programming: Ways to Write Better, More Idiomatic Perl, ISBN 978-0-321-49694-2 (second edition, 2010)
- Programming Perl, ISBN 0-596-00492-3 (fourth edition, 2011)
- Learning Perl 6, ISBN 1-49197-768-X (2018)
