= Henry Lee Jones =

American criminal and serial killer (1963-)

- Jones's 2023 Mugshot
- Born: August 23, 1963 (age 63); Cleveland, Mississippi, U.S.
- Other name: "Bam"
- Convictions: First degree murder x3 Robbery; Kidnapping; Grand theft
- Penalty: Florida: Death (overturned); Tennessee: Death

Details
- Victims: 3–4+
- Span of crimes: August 22 – 26, 2003 (confirmed)
- Country: United States
- States: Tennessee, Florida
- Date apprehended: September 17, 2003
- Imprisoned at: Riverbend Maximum Security Institution, Nashville, Tennessee

Henry Lee Jones (born August 23, 1963) is an American convicted criminal and serial killer who has been sentenced to death on multiple occasions for the murders of three people in Tennessee and Florida in August 2003. In addition to these crimes, he remains the prime suspect in a fourth killing dating back to 2002, and possibly other murders.

== Early life and crimes ==
Henry Lee Jones was born on August 23, 1963, in Cleveland, Mississippi. Little is known about his upbringing, but later on in life, Jones claimed that he grew up without a father and was regularly beaten with various objects by older relatives. At some point during his teens, he moved to Fort Lauderdale, Florida, where he soon would delve into a life of crime and serve several prison sentences for minor offenses.

On October 3, 1981, the then-18-year-old Jones and a 19-year-old accomplice named Jackie Johnson went to the Johnny Harris Pontiac car dealership in Fort Lauderdale, where they planned to steal a car. After they were presented with several models by 45-year-old salesman Joseph Giovanni, they picked a tan 1976 Pontiac Grand Prix and asked to go on a test drive with it. Jones drove the car while Giovanni sat next to him and Johnson sat in the back, and after some time, the pair held Giovanni at gunpoint. After finding a deserted area, all three got out of the car, whereupon Jones and Johnson robbed Giovanni and forced him into the trunk. They then picked up Jones' girlfriend, 17-year-old Annie Mae Robbins, and drove around for two hours until they found an orange grove, where they left Giovanni behind and sped away.

A few hours after this, the trio were pulled over by a highway patrol officer, but as the officer returned to his vehicle to check the license plate, Jones attempted to speed away. However, a short time afterwards, Jones turned towards a dirt road until they reached some train tracks, which blew out the car's tires and caused oil to leak. The trio then attempted to run away on foot, but were quickly surrounded by police - Robbins surrendered, while Jones and Johnson were caught along the I-95. Jones and Johnson were both charged, and after a brief and unsuccessful attempt to escape, Jones was found guilty and sentenced to a total of 35 years imprisonment for robbery, kidnapping and grand theft.

During his time in prison, Jones proved to be a violent and insubordinate inmate who was reprimanded a total of 36 times for offenses such as fighting and assaulting other inmates, weapons possession, disorderly conduct, etc. The most notable of these crimes was inciting a prison riot at the Liberty Correctional Institution in Bristol on January 23, 1991, for which he was given more prison time. Despite all of his infractions, he was released from the Tomoka Correctional Institution in Daytona Beach on July 1, 1997, due to prison overcrowding.

=== Post-release crimes ===
From the period of 1999 to 2001, Jones was repeatedly jailed for a variety of offenses ranging from stalking, drug possession and violating restraining orders, but either served short sentences or the charges were dropped. On October 10, 2001, he was arrested and charged with assaulting his then-girlfriend and stealing a gray 1988 Ford Fiesta from a car dealership, but as the district attorney felt that they were lacking credible evidence, the charges of grand theft were dropped and Jones was allowed to plead guilty to two misdemeanor charges, for which he was given an 8-month prison sentence.

On May 14, 2002, another girlfriend of Jones' reported him to Fort Lauderdale police for allegedly drugging and raping her mentally-handicapped teenage son. According to the statement, Jones and the victim had spent most of the day drinking, riding bikes and using Percodan together, until they eventually went to "chill" at the girlfriend's house. After drinking and swallowing more Percodan, the victim was supposedly left near-incapacitated, which allowed Jones to drag him to the bedroom and continuously rape him for three hours. Six weeks after the initial report, the Assistant State Attorney for Broward County, Lauren Covitz, announced that she would not press charges due to the unlikely chance of a conviction. Because of this, Jones was never prosecuted for this supposed crime.

== Murders ==
=== Keith Gross ===
Sometime in July 2002, Jones befriended 24-year-old Keith Gross, an employee at a local store named Kitchens to Go, and the pair would often smoke weed together. Presenting himself as "Bam", Jones was introduced to Gross' employer and friend, Ken Walker, who warned him to steer clear of his new "friend" because he had a bad feeling about him, which Gross ignored for the most part. On September 9, 2002, Walker had invited Gross to come over to his house so they could watch a game of football, but Gross failed to arrive. Walker became worried even further when he failed to arrive at work the following day, and after waiting for a few hours, he went to Gross' apartment on Sunrise Boulevard to check on him.

After peeking through the window, Walker saw Gross' naked, hogtied body on the floor of his apartment, with a T-shirt tied around his neck. Upon closer inspection, he also saw that his throat had been slit and that the killer had apparently wiped the murder weapon on Gross' butt cheek, judging by the smudges of blood left on it. Horrified by the discovery, Walker drove back to his store and phoned the police, who immediately went to the crime scene. The subsequent investigation, led by Det. Mark Shotwell, started posting flyers around the city's gay bars as a way to seek information on Gross' death: this move was criticized by Walker and Gross' older brother, Michael, who said that Keith was not gay and would never visit such an establishment. They instead directed the police's attention to Jones, but after questioning, authorities surmized that it was unlikely that he was the killer, as they believed Jones to be straight and, as a friend of Gross, would have no motive to commit such an act. Because of this, Jones was never arrested and the case went cold.

=== Clarence and Lillian James ===
On August 22, 2003, accompanied by a 20-year-old homeless male prostitute named Tevarus Young, whom he had picked up from a bar in Fort Lauderdale in his Dodge. After paying him to perform oral sex, Jones asked Young to accompany him on a road trip to Bartlett, Tennessee, where he had once resided. While driving through the town, Jones stopped by the house of 82-year-old Clarence and 64-year-old Lillian James, an elderly couple who were well known for their friendliness towards strangers. Clarence politely asked Young to move a lawn mower to the backyard, which Jones utilized to his advantage to go inside. There, he tied the pair up and proceeded to stab and strangle both of them before ultimately slitting their throats with a pair of scissors. The blood-soaked Jones was soon discovered by Young, whom he ordered to help remove the bindings from the bodies and ransack the house, and after searching through it, the pair took the spouses' credit card and some jewellery before fleeing the scene. According to later testimony from Young, Jones threatened to kill him if he ever told anyone about the crimes and even raped him at a rest stop, before the pair made a stop in Mississippi to buy a white four-door Lincoln Town Car.

The Jameses' bodies were found by police on the following day, after their daughter phoned in to report that was something was wrong. News of the murder quickly spread around the area, with many locals shocked that somebody would kill the Jameses. Bartlett police released a statement announcing that they believed the crime was committed by two black males who were last seen in the vicinity of the home, but at that time, they were unable to identify who they were. In the meantime, Young and Jones were pulled over by police in Melbourne, Florida, which resulted in Young's detainment as he had an outstanding warrant for an unrelated crime. Jones was allowed to leave, but was told to return and pick up the Dodge at a later date.

=== Carlos Perez ===
Sometime before the crimes, Jones met 19-year-old Carlos Perez, a native of Wilton Manors who was travelling to his workplace at a construction site in Fort Lauderdale. Since he had also applied for work there, the two befriended one another and occasionally went out to buy crack cocaine together. While it is unclear how or why, Perez accepted an offer to accompany Jones to the Super 8 Motel in nearby Melbourne, where they hired a room for two on August 26. After they were left alone, Jones hogtied, raped and strangled Perez, before then slitting his throat and wrapping him in a comforter and leaving it on the bed. Perez's body was discovered by the housekeeper on the following day and the police were quickly informed. A subsequent autopsy noted multiple abrasions on the victim's anus, wrists and ankles; bite marks on his neck and strangulations marks around his wrists and legs. Most notably, the coroner noted that the killer had slashed Perez's neck several times, with the deepness of each new cut eventually severing his jugular vein.

A forensic examination of the motel room determined that the killer had attempted to wipe away fingerprints, but was apparently unsuccessful. Subsequent examination of DNA found on Perez's penis was matched to an unknown woman, and two pubic hairs were positively matched to Jones' mitochondrial DNA.

== Investigation and arrest ==
Upon investigating the crime scene, police in Melbourne were notified that a black male driving a white four-door Lincoln Town Car had bought gas in their city using a credit card stolen from Tennessee. After contacting their counterparts in Tennessee, the investigators realized that their crime scenes shared remarkable similarities, most notable of which was the description of an older black male and the Lincoln Town Car. An inspection of all the registered cars eventually led them to Jones, and on September 16, Tennessee filed murder charges and filed an arrest warrant against him.

On the next day, Jones was spotted driving along Sunrise Boulevard in Fort Lauderdale, whereupon several police officers and marshals attempted to pull him over. He instead speed away and led them on a brief chase before he was finally apprehended. A search of the car he was driving revealed a pair of Nike sneakers and a Puerto Rican flag, which were identified as belonging to Perez. While awaiting extradition to Tennessee, authorities from several states around the country started investigating Jones for possible involvement in unsolved murders within their jurisdiction. This led to the Fort Lauderdale police to identify him as a prime suspect in Gross' murder, after they linked his footprints to the bloodied ones found at the crime scene. Following Young's arrest, both men were extradited to face murder charges in Tennessee.

== Trials, convictions and appeals ==
Jones was first indicted for murder on October 7, 2003, with prosecutors announcing their intent to seek the death penalty against him. At this initial trial, prosecutors were allowed to present evidence from the Perez murder, which convinced the jury of the defendant's guilt and resulted in a guilty verdict. In the meantime, Young pleaded guilty to two counts of facilitation of first-degree murder and was sentenced to 13 1/2 years imprisonment.

In May 2009, Jones was found guilty of the Tennessee crimes and sentenced to death, whereupon authorities from Florida indicted him for Perez's murder. While Jones claimed he was innocent in that case, family members and the prosecutor demanded the death penalty for him. During the proceedings, Jones, who chose to act as his own attorney in spite of attempts from the judge to convince him otherwise, complained that belongings like his legal paperwork, glasses and Bible were left behind in Tennessee. According to Jones, he chose to represent himself after he fired his public defender for encouraging him to waive his right to a speedy trial. For security reasons, the trial location was moved from Titusville to the Viera Justice Center in Viera.

Throughout the proceedings, Jones questioned the validity of the evidence presented by both the prosecutors and their medical examiner, Dr. Sajid Qaiser, as well as the testimonies of witnesses. At times, he simply complained that he did not have full access to all evidence in the case, and on one occasion apologized about causing confusion in regards to an incident concerning a report and one of the witnesses. In the end, the jury found him guilty on all counts and recommended the death sentence. After the announcement of the guilty verdict, Jones appeared unfazed, and supposedly even smiled. He was officially sentenced to death in May 2014, with the verdict being openly welcomed by Perez's father and the father of Keith Gross.

That same year, Jones' death sentence was automatically reviewed by the Tennessee Supreme Court, which ruled that the verdict should be overturned, citing the fact that state law prohibited admission of evidence from unrelated murder cases. Because of this, a new trial was ordered. After a six-day trial, he was found guilty on four counts of murder (two for premeditated and two for felony murder each) and given four separate death sentences by Justice Mark Ward. Before the end of the trial, Tevarus Young, who had been released from prison by then, was ordered to testify, but instead hid out somewhere in south Florida because he did not want to go to court again.

Since then, Jones has repeatedly attempted to have his sentences commuted, but so far has been unsuccessful. His last appeal to the Tennessee Supreme Court was denied in 2019, with the court instead upholding the original verdict. As of April 2024, he remains on death row at the Riverbend Maximum Security Institution in Nashville.

== See also ==
- Capital punishment in Tennessee
- Capital punishment in Florida
- List of death row inmates in the United States § Tennessee
