= Harry Jones (footballer, born 1891) =

English footballer

Personal information
- Date of birth: 24 May 1891
- Place of birth: Blackwell, England
- Date of death: May 1947 (aged 55–56)
- Height: 5 ft 9 1/2 in (1.77 m)
- Position: Left back

Senior career*
Years	Team	Apps	(Gls)
- Nottingham Forest

International career
1923	England	1	(0)
- * Club domestic league appearances and goals

Harry Jones (24 May 1891 – May 1947) was an English international footballer, who played as a left back.

== Career ==
Born in Blackwell, Jones played professionally for Nottingham Forest, and earned one cap for England in 1923.
