= Harry Clary Jones =

American physical chemist

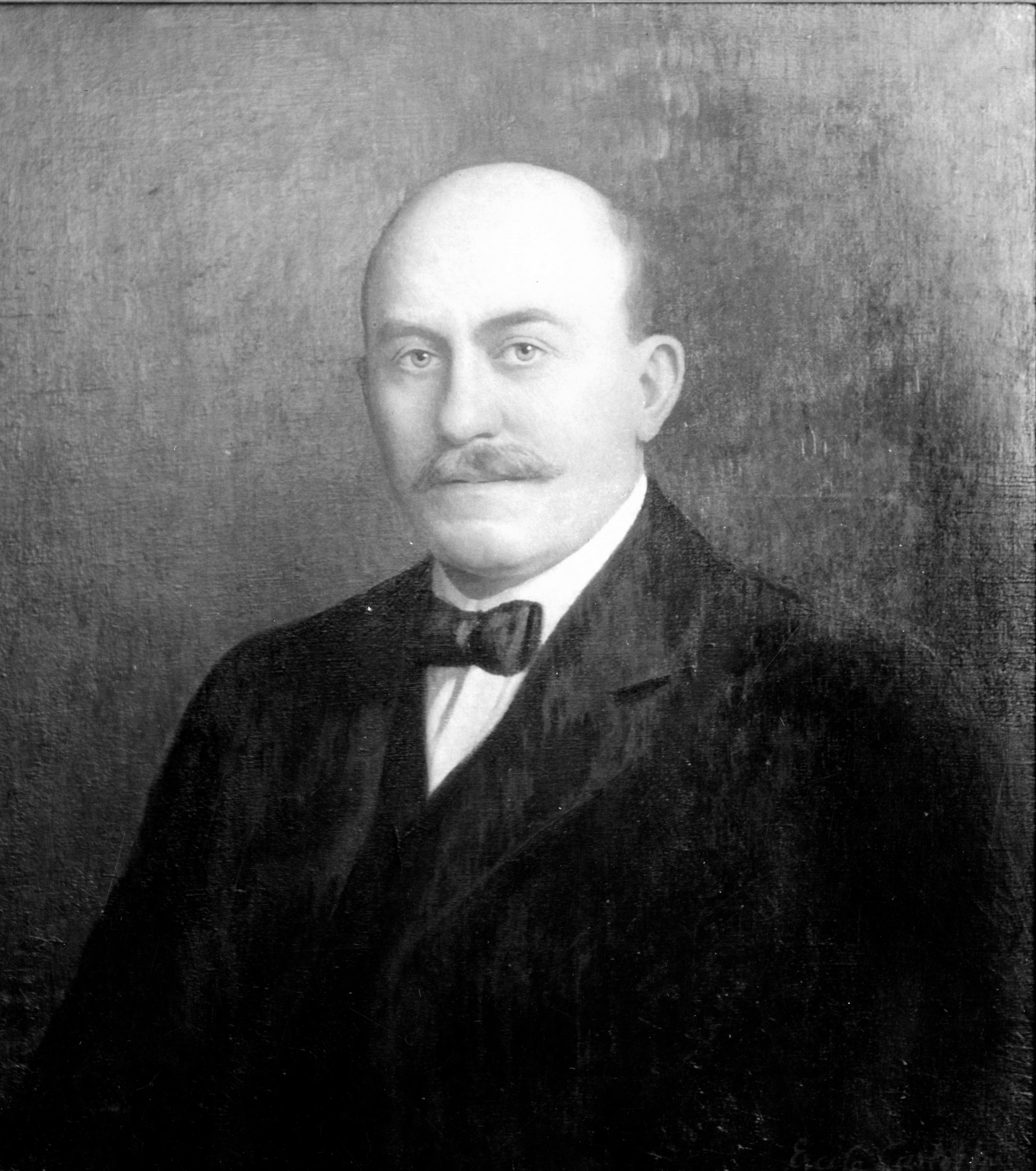

Harry Clary Jones (11 November 1865 – 9 April 1916) was an American physical chemist and a professor of chemistry at Johns Hopkins University. He worked extensively on the chemistry of solutions. His textbook Elements of Physical Chemistry was influential in its day. In 1913, he published a vision of chemistry in his book A new era in chemistry in which he noted the gaps of contemporary chemistry and indicated directions for work.

== Life and work ==
Jones was born in New London, Maryland in a farming family and went to study chemistry at Johns Hopkins University, receiving a PhD in 1892 with studies under Harmon N. Morse. He then travelled to Europe where he worked for two years at the laboratories of Wilhelm Ostwald in Leipzig, Svante Arrhenius in Stockholm and Jacobus van't Hoff in Amsterdam. He then joined Johns Hopkins as a fellow and from 1895 as an instructor. He became a full professor in 1903. He published several books and many papers and was a popular teacher who would recount anecdotes from the lives of chemists he had worked with in Europe. At the time of his death, he was writing a book on the Nature of Solution. This was published posthumously with a biographical note by his colleague E. Emmet Reid. Jones was depressed and committed suicide by consuming a cyanide pill.

Jones married Harriet Brooks in 1902.
