= Henry Wanton Jones =

Canadian painter (1925–2021)

- Born: 11 May 1925; Waterloo, Quebec, Canada
- Died: 19 March 2021 (aged 95); Morin-Heights, Quebec, Canada
- Occupation: Painter

Henry Wanton Jones (11 May 1925 – 19 March 2021) was a Canadian painter.

== Biography ==
Jones was born in Waterloo in 1925. He studied fine arts at Sir Howard Douglas Hall and subsequently attended the School of Art at the Montreal Museum of Fine Arts under the guidance of Arthur Lismer and Jacques de Tonnancour.

Jones took a surrealist approach to his artwork, and his dreamlike and erotic works made him a known across Canada. He also sculpted in the 1960s and 70s and addressed recurring themes in the equestrian world. From 2017 to 2018, the Sherbrooke Museum of Fine Arts displayed an exhibition called Henry Wanton Jones. Démasqué! in his honor.

Henri Wanton Jones died in Morin-Heights on 19 March 2021 at the age of 95.

== Works ==
- Landscape at Night (1959)
- Head (1960)
- L'amour (1975)
- Landscape with White Pines
- Nature morte
- Sans titre
