= Joseph M. Hall Jr. =

American historian

Joseph McLean Hall Jr. is a professor, writer, and historian at Bates College in Lewiston, Maine where he specializes in early modern American history, particularly focusing on Native American, European, and environmental interactions in North America. He is a nationally recognized historian for his research in Native American history, and in addition to his work in academia, he often contributes to local newspapers and gives presentations to public audiences. Hall also provides important historical perspectives and consultations for scientific papers. His current research focuses on the political ecology of Wabanaki place names. Hall is also working on a book project concerning the Maine coast and the Bates-Morse Mountain Conservation Area in collaboration with faculty in the natural sciences. He is an associate professor at Bates in the History department and the Environmental Studies (ES) program, having recently chaired the ES program and multiple hiring committees for new ES faculty. In 2011, Hall co-directed the Bates Fall Semester Abroad in Nantes, France. He also received the 2009 Kroepsch Award for Excellence in Teaching and the honor of delivering the 2018 Convocation Address at Bates.

Hall is originally from Newport, Rhode Island and received his B.A. at Amherst College (1991) and his M.A. (1995) and Ph.D. (2001) at the University of Wisconsin–Madison. He is the author of many articles, essays, and books including Zamumo’s Gifts: Indian-European Exchange in the Colonial Southeast (2012) and Making an Indian People: Creek Formation in the Colonial Southeast, 1590-1735 (2001). His works have been positively reviewed and cited in peer-reviewed journals such as The Journal of Southern History, The Florida Historical Quarterly, The William and Mary Quarterly, Maine History, and Mediterranean Studies.

Hall focuses on teaching rather than research and offers a diversity of history courses at Bates, many of which are cross-listed in interdisciplinary programs such as Africana, American Studies, and Environmental Studies.
