= Nancy Bayley =

American psychologist

- Born: 28 September 1899; The Dalles, Oregon
- Died: 25 November 1994 (aged 95); Carmel-by-the-Sea, California
- Education: University of Iowa (Ph.D. 1926)
- Known for: Berkeley Growth Study; Bayley Scales of Infant Development
- Awards: APA Distinguished Scientific Contribution Award, 1966 G. Stanley Hall Award for Distinguished Contributions to Developmental Psychology, 1971 APA Gold Medal Award, 1982
- Scientific career
- Fields: Psychology, developmental psychology
- Workplaces: University of California, Berkeley; National Institute of Mental Health

Nancy Bayley (28 September 1899 – 25 November 1994) was an American psychologist best known for her work on the Berkeley Growth Study and the subsequent Bayley Scales of Infant Development. Originally interested in teaching, she eventually gained interest in psychology, for which she went on to obtain her Ph.D. in from the University of Iowa in 1926. Within two years, Bayley had accepted a position at the Institute for Child Welfare (now called the Institute for Human Development) at the University of California, Berkeley. There she began the longitudinal Berkeley Growth Study, which worked to create a guide of physical and behavioral growth across development. Bayley also examined the development of cognitive and motor functions in children, leading to her belief that intelligence evolves over the course of child development. In 1954, Bayley began working on the National Collaborative Perinatal Project (NCPP) with the National Institute of Mental Health (NIMH), where she applied her work to infants. After retiring in 1968, Bayley synthesized her work and published the Bayley Scales of Infant Development, which is still in use today. For her efforts in the field of psychology, Bayley became the first woman to receive the Distinguished Scientific Contribution award from the American Psychological Association (APA), of which she was a fellow, amongst other honorary awards. Bayley was also a member of the American Association for the Advancement of Science. She died at the age of 95 from a respiratory illness.

== Biography ==
=== Early life and education ===
Bayley was born on September 28, 1899, in Dalles, Oregon. She was the fourth of five children born to Prudence Cooper Bayley and Fredrick W. Bayley. She came from a family of pioneers. Until the age of 8, Bayley was a sickly child and could not attend school. Yet, even with her delayed enrollment at public school, she quickly caught up. Later, she enrolled in the University of Washington to become an English teacher, but after taking an introductory psychology course she changed her path. In 1922, she completed her Bachelor of Science in psychology, which was followed by a Master of Science in the same field in 1924. During her years at the University of Washington, she got the opportunity to work as a laboratory assistant in the Gatzert Foundation for Child Welfare. Bayley earned her doctoral degree at the University of Iowa in 1926.

=== Career and marriage ===
Bayley started her career in 1926 at the University of Wyoming, where she was an instructor until 1928. There she published her first of almost 200 papers. In 1928, Bayley moved to the University of California, Berkeley, to work in the Institute of Child Welfare. It was here that Bayley began work on the Berkeley Growth Study. On April 7, 1929, she married her husband, John, R. Reid. He was at the University of California, Berkeley completing his own doctoral work in philosophy. In 1954, she went to the National Institute of Mental Health in Bethesda, Maryland, where she worked on child development in the Laboratory of Psychology. In 1964, Bayley returned to Berkeley and published the Bayley Scales of Infant Development. She retired in 1968 but continued to revise the Bayley Scales of Infant Development. Bayley and her husband lived the remainder of their lives in Carmel, California. She died at the age of 95 from respiratory illness.

== Berkeley Growth Study ==
In 1928, Bayley began work at the Institute for Child Welfare at the University of California, Berkeley, on what is referred to as the Berkeley Growth Study. The study aimed to study human development from infancy to adulthood on a range of physical, psychological, and physiological characteristics. Bayley became the director of the program in 1931. Through her efforts, Bayley was able to publish the California First-Year Mental Scale in 1933 and the California Infant Scale of Motor Development in 1936, precursors to her later Bayley Scales of Infant Development.

=== Sample demographics ===
The Berkeley Growth Study had 61 participating children born between September 25, 1928, and May 15, 1929. The children were white, raised in English-speaking homes within the Berkeley area, and were of above average socioeconomic status. Measurements began four days after birth, at which time all children were considered to be of normal health. The sample decreased to 42 participating children by 1941, due primarily to family relocation.

=== Measurements ===
Bayley assessed the children on their physical, motor, mental, and physiological development. An analysis of trends in the data was then conducted, with particular reference to the age of developments, as well as a correlational investigation of relating factors. Assessments were conducted once a month from birth to 15 months, once every three months from 15 to 36 months, and every six months after 36 months. Initial measurements focused on reflexes and bodily measurements, such as blood pressure and breathing rates. Additionally, information was gathered regarding the maternal and prenatal history. Subsequent assessments were conducted at the Institute for Child Welfare, as well as at home visits, pediatric centers, and at play-based field group outings.

Mental measurements included the California First-Year Mental Scale, the California Pre-school Mental Scale, vocabulary tests, and Stanford-Binet intelligence tests. Motor assessments examined speed, dexterity, and reflexes, amongst other things. Participants completed the California Infant Scale of Motor Development, as well as examinations of footprint records. Physiological tests assessed exercise and exertion abilities, the galvanic skin reflex, and metabolism. Additional assessments involved body dimensions, x-rays, and tests of emotion and personality.

=== Outcomes ===
Variations in intelligence across the lifespan led Bayley to conclude that intelligence is not fixed at birth, but instead impacted by encounters with environmental factors. Bayley thus argued that hindrances in development stemmed from social influences, such as poverty, rather than psychological influences. Other factors Bayley considered vitally important to development were parenting attitudes and behaviors. Examinations of x-rays and physiological growth led Bayley to become the first scientist to recognize the predictability of adult height based on infant size. Additionally, Bayley discovered no gender differences in terms of physical and psychological development.

Measures of assessment were later published by Bayley, including the California First-Year Mental Scale and the California Infant Scale of Motor Development, which collectively lead to the development of the Bayley Scales of Infant Development.

== Bayley Scales of Infant Development ==
=== Developing the scales ===
The original version of the Bayley Scales of Infant and Toddler Development were published by Nancy Bayley in 1969, though they have since been revised to the Bayley Scales of Infant and Toddler Development-II (BSID-II) and the currently used BSID-III. The original BSID was developed by combining three previous scales: the California First-Year Mental Scale, the California Preschool Mental Scale, and the California Infant Scale of Motor Development. The purpose of the BSID-III is to gain further information about a child's developmental milestones and abilities, as well as to intervene at an early age if a learning disability presents itself.

=== Measurements ===
The Mental and Motor Scales have remained relatively the same through all versions, with some changes made to the Behavior Rating Scale. These changes include: age range, norms altered to function more successfully with modernization, and greater validity and reliability. The Mental Scale presented in BSID-II assesses children using a normalized standardized scoring system – the Mental Development Index (MDI) – and a standard scoring system – the Psychomotor Development Index (PDI). The MDI is used to measure mental capabilities in children, including sensory and perceptual acuities, object constancy, memory, learning, problem solving, early verbal communication, early abstract thinking ability, and early number concepts. The PDI is used to gauge control of the body, such as fine and gross motor skills. The Behavior Rating Scale presents a numerical assessment of a child's attention, arousal, orientation/engagement, emotional regulation, and motor ability. The BSID-III is most beneficial for studies regarding developmental, psychological, and neuropsychological information in children up to 42 months old; after 42 months of age the information becomes less reliable. The amount of time required to administer the test depends greatly on the age of the child. This variability occurs because each portion of the test has specific instructions on how to administer it to the child. For instance, in the motor tasks there are certain positions the child is to be placed in. When scoring the test, each task throughout both motor and cognitive is either given or not given credit based on how the child responds to the task that is presented. Notes are made along the way while administering the test if there are refusals made, items are omitted, or there is an issue with the caregiver report. In these cases, an examiner will go back and administer another exam to obtain data for that test.

== Selected works ==
Bayley, N., & Jones, H. E. (1937). Environmental correlates of mental and motor development: A cumulative study from infancy to six years. Child Development, 8, 329–341.

Bayley, N. (1940). Studies in the development of young children. Berkeley: University of California Press

Jones, H. E., & Bayley, N. (1941). The Berkeley growth study. Child Development, 12(2), 167–173.

Bayley, N. (1949). Consistency and variability in the growth of intelligence from birth to eighteen years. Journal of Genetic Psychology, 75, 165–196.

Bayley, N. (1966). Bayley Scales of Infant Development. New York: Psychological Corporation.

Bayley, N. (1968). Behavioral correlates of mental growth: Birth to thirty-six years. American Psychologist, 23, 1–17.
