= Bayley Scales of Infant Development =

Used to sample the intellectual growth of infants and toddlers

- Purpose: assess development of infants

The Bayley Scales of Infant and Toddler Development (version 4 was released September 2019) is a standard series of measurements originally developed by psychologist Nancy Bayley used primarily to assess the development of infants and toddlers, ages 1–42 months. This measure consists of a series of developmental play tasks and takes between 45 – 60 minutes to administer and derives a developmental quotient (DQ) rather than an intelligence quotient (IQ). Raw scores of successfully completed items are converted to scale scores and to composite scores. These scores are used to determine the child's performance compared with norms taken from typically developing children of their age (in months). The Bayley-III has three main subtests; the Cognitive Scale, which includes items such as attention to familiar and unfamiliar objects, looking for a fallen object, and pretend play, the Language Scale, which taps understanding and expression of language, for example, recognition of objects and people, following directions, and naming objects and pictures, and the Motor Scale, which assesses gross and fine motor skills such as grasping, sitting, stacking blocks, and climbing stairs. There are two additional Bayley-II Scales depend on parental report, including the Social-Emotional scale, which asks caregivers about such behaviors as ease of calming, social responsiveness, and imitation play, and the Adaptive Behavior scale which asks about adaptions to the demands of daily life, including communication, self-control, following rules, and getting along with others. The Bayley-III Cognitive and Language scales are good predictors of preschool mental test performance. These scores are largely used for screening, helping to identify the need for further observation and intervention, as infants who score very low are at risk for future developmental problems.

== Development ==
Prior to the first official scale by Nancy Bayley, research was conducted to determine which important variables should be included in a cumulative developmental test for infants. In 1965, Nancy Bayley conducted an experiment examining mental and motor test scores for infants aged 1 to 15 months, comparing sex, birth order, race, geographical location, and parental education. No differences in scores were found for either scale between boys and girls, first-born and later-born, education of either father or mother, or geographic residence. No differences were found between African Americans and Caucasians on the Mental Scale, but the African American babies tended consistently to score above the Caucasians on the Motor Scale. These findings emphasised the need to study in careful detail the development of mental processes in the second year of life. Within this period evidently will be found the explanation of the socioeconomic and ethnic differences in mental functioning that are repeatedly found for children of 4 years and older. Following the need for further investigation, Nancy Bayley conducted a related experiment in which the reliability of her revised scale of mental and motor development during the first year of life was tested, which yielded the following results: (1) Mental Scale items with high tester-observer and high test-retest reliabilities deal with object-oriented behavior; (2) Mental Scale items with low test-retest reliabilities require social interaction; (3) Motor Scale items with high tester-observer and high test-retest reliabilities deal with independent control of head, trunk, and extremities; (4) Motor Scale items with low test-retest reliability require assistance by an adult. These findings implicated early diagnosis of neural malfunctioning. Likewise, Nancy Bayley also conducted a test on infant vocalizations and their relationships to mature intelligence beginning in 1967, in which participants were monitored over longitudinal studies, which followed infants’ use of vocalizing displeasures and satisfaction, and correlating them with language skills of the same individual over childhood and adolescence, into early adulthood. The results indicate that vocalizations did significantly correlate with girls’ later intelligence, increasingly so with age, and more highly with verbal then performance scores.

== Second Edition (1993–2006) ==
=== Application ===
While applying the Bayley Scales of Infant Development (BSID-II), it was found that scales may lead to under-estimates of cognitive abilities in infants with Down syndrome. Researchers excluded a number of items that implicated language, motor, attentional and social functioning from the original measures the modified form was administered to 17 infants with Down syndrome and to 41 typically developing infants. Results suggested the modified version provided a meaningful and stable measure of cognitive functioning in infants with Down syndrome.

=== Validity ===
Researchers assessed the predictive validity of the BSID-II Mental Development Index (MDI) for cognitive function at school age for infants born with extremely low birth weight (ELBW). Data was studied from the BSID-II tests of 344 ELBW infants admitted to the neonatal intensive care unit at the Rainbow Infants and Children's Hospital in Cleveland, OH from 1992 to 1995. It was found that the predictive validity of a subnormal MDI for cognitive function at school age is poor but better for ELBW children who have neurosensory impairments. This brought on concern that decisions to provide intensive care for ELBW infants in the delivery room might be biased because of reported high rates of cognitive impairments.

== Third Edition (2006–2019) ==
=== Improvements ===
The Bayley Scales of Infant and Toddler Development–Third Edition (Bayley-III) is a revision of the frequently used and well-known Bayley Scales of Infant Development–Second Edition (BSID-II; Bayley, 1993). Like its prior editions, the Bayley-III is an individually administered instrument designed to measure the developmental functioning of infants and toddlers. Other specific purposes of the Bayley-III are to identify possible developmental delay, inform professionals about specific areas of strength or weakness when planning a comprehensive intervention, and provide a method of monitoring a child's developmental progress. The most significant revision to the Bayley-III is the development of five distinct scales (as compared to three scales in the BSID-II) to be consistent with areas of appropriate developmental assessment for children from birth to age 3. Whereas the BSID-II provided Mental, Motor, and Behavior scales, the Bayley-III revision includes Cognitive, Language, Motor, Social-Emotional, and Adaptive Behavior scales. Considering that the primary intent of the Bayley-III is to identify children experiencing developmental delay and not to specifically diagnose a disorder, the floor and ceiling of the subtest and total test appear to be adequate. As would be expected from an adaptive behavior measure (i.e., ABAS-II) that was developed independently of the Bayley-III, the floor for the Adaptive Behavior scale extends downward to a composite score of 40 (extending upwards to a score of 160), whereas the remaining Bayley-III floor composite scores are relatively higher (Cognitive, 55–145; Language, 47–153; Motor, 46–154; Social-Emotional, 55–145). One area that was not improved, however, are the subtest floor scores for the youngest children in the sample (i.e., those aged 16 to 25 days). Likewise, when a 2011 study was conducted comparing the relationship between test scores using the second and third editions of the Bayley Scales in extremely preterm children, it was concluded that interpreting these scores should be done with caution as the correlation with the previous edition appears worse at lower test score values.

=== Application ===
The relationship between abnormal feeding patterns and language patterns and language performance on the BSID-III at 18–22 months among extremely premature infants was evaluated. 1477 preterm infants born at <26 weeks gestation completed an 18-month neurodevelopmental follow-up assessment including the Receptive and Expressive Language Subscales of the BSID-III. Abnormal feeding behaviors were reported in 193 (13%) of these infants at 18–22 months. It was determined with the help of the BSID-III that at 18 months adjusted age, premature infants with a history of feeding difficulties are more likely to have a language delay.

Another more recent study focused on how the application of the BSID-III was useful in recommending treatments for infants in a Neo-natal Intensive Care Unit follow-up clinic. It assessed if the BSID-III was predictive of a referral for further developmental therapy. Independent sample t-tests were conducted to compare motor performance to recommendations for motor therapy found there was a significant difference in the gross motor scores for those who were and were not recommended for motor therapy. Findings indicated that the factors that influence follow-up recommendations are complex and the test scores alone were not indicative of whether or not a referral was given.

== Fourth Edition (2019–present) ==
The most current version of the BSID is the BSID 4, released in 2019.
