= 1922 USA Outdoor Track and Field Championships =

American athletics championship event

- Dates: 9–11 September (men)
- Host city: Newark, New Jersey (men)
- Venue: Weequahic Park (men)
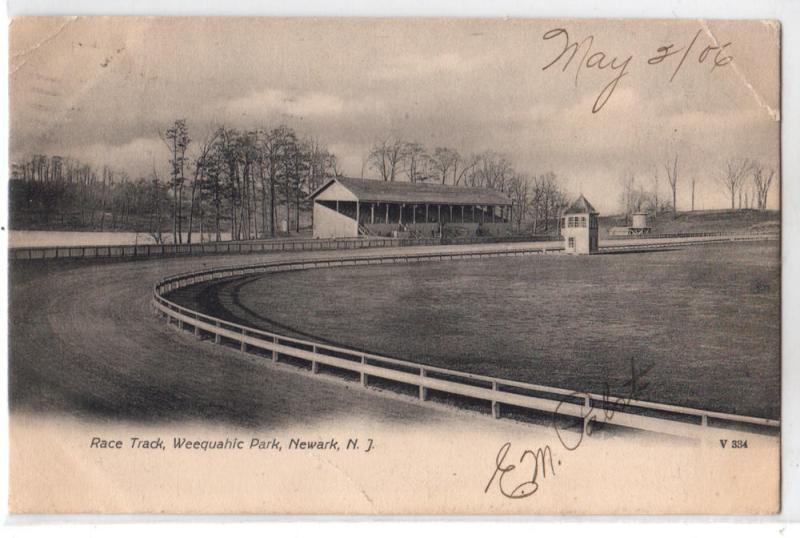

The 1922 USA Outdoor Track and Field Championships were organized by the Amateur Athletic Union (AAU) and served as the national championships in outdoor track and field for the United States.

The men's edition was held at Weequahic Park in Newark, New Jersey, and it took place 9–11 September. The first women's championships were not held until 1923.

The championships were considered the best attended meet to date, with over 40,000 spectators reported. The weather was cloudy and cool.

== Results ==
Event	Gold		Silver		Bronze	
100 yards	Robert McAllister	10.0	Alfred Leconey	2 feet behind	Edward Farrell	4 feet behind 2nd
220 yards	Alfred Leconey	22.1	Harold Jones	5 yards behind	William Hayes	
440 yards	Jim Driscoll	49.9	William Stevenson	50.8	Earl Dudley	
880 yards	Alan Helffrich	1:56.3	Thomas Campbell	8 yards behind	Joseph Ray	1 yard behind 2nd
1 mile	Joseph Ray	4:17.0	James Connolly	10 yards behind	Russell Wharton	2 yards behind 2nd
5 miles	Earl Johnson	25:33.0	Ville Ritola (FIN)	6 yards behind	Lloyd Rathburn	220 yards behind 2nd
120 yards hurdles	Earl Thomson (CAN)	15.3	Karl Anderson		Harrison Thompson	
440 yards hurdles	Joseph Hall	56.5	DeGay Ernst		George Stolley	
2 miles steeplechase	Michael Devaney	11:10.2	Marvin Rick	30 yards behind	Albert Michelson	30 yards behind 2nd
High jump	Devey Alberts	1.96 m	Harold Osborn	1.96 m	LeRoy Brown	1.85 m
Pole vault	Edward Knourek	3.96 m	Ralph Spearow	3.96 m	Edwin Myers	3.66 m
Long jump	William DeHart Hubbard	7.45 m	Edward Gourdin	7.31 m	Solomon Butler	7.21 m
Triple jump	William DeHart Hubbard	14.67 m	Harold Osborn	14.25 m	Anthony Plansky	13.98 m
Shot put	Patrick McDonald	14.31 m	Ralph Hills	14.22 m	Orville Wanzer	14.03 m
Discus throw	Augustus Pope	44.47 m	Clarence Houser	43.11 m	Thomas Lieb	41.93 m
Hammer throw	Matthew McGrath	47.47 m	Charles Dandrow	46.58 m	Ralph Hills	46.51 m
Javelin throw	Flint Hanner	58.88 m	Harry Hoffman	55.88 m	Racine Thompson	51.16 m
Decathlon	Harrison Thompson	6890.23 pts	Harold Osborn	6798.46 pts	Eugene Vidal	6461.58 pts
220 yards hurdles	John Coard Taylor	24.6				
Pentathlon	Ned Gourdin	10 pts				
Weight throw for distance	Matt McGrath	10.92 m				

== See also ==
- List of USA Outdoor Track and Field Championships winners (men)
- List of USA Outdoor Track and Field Championships winners (women)
