= Randal L. Schwartz =

American programmer and technology writer

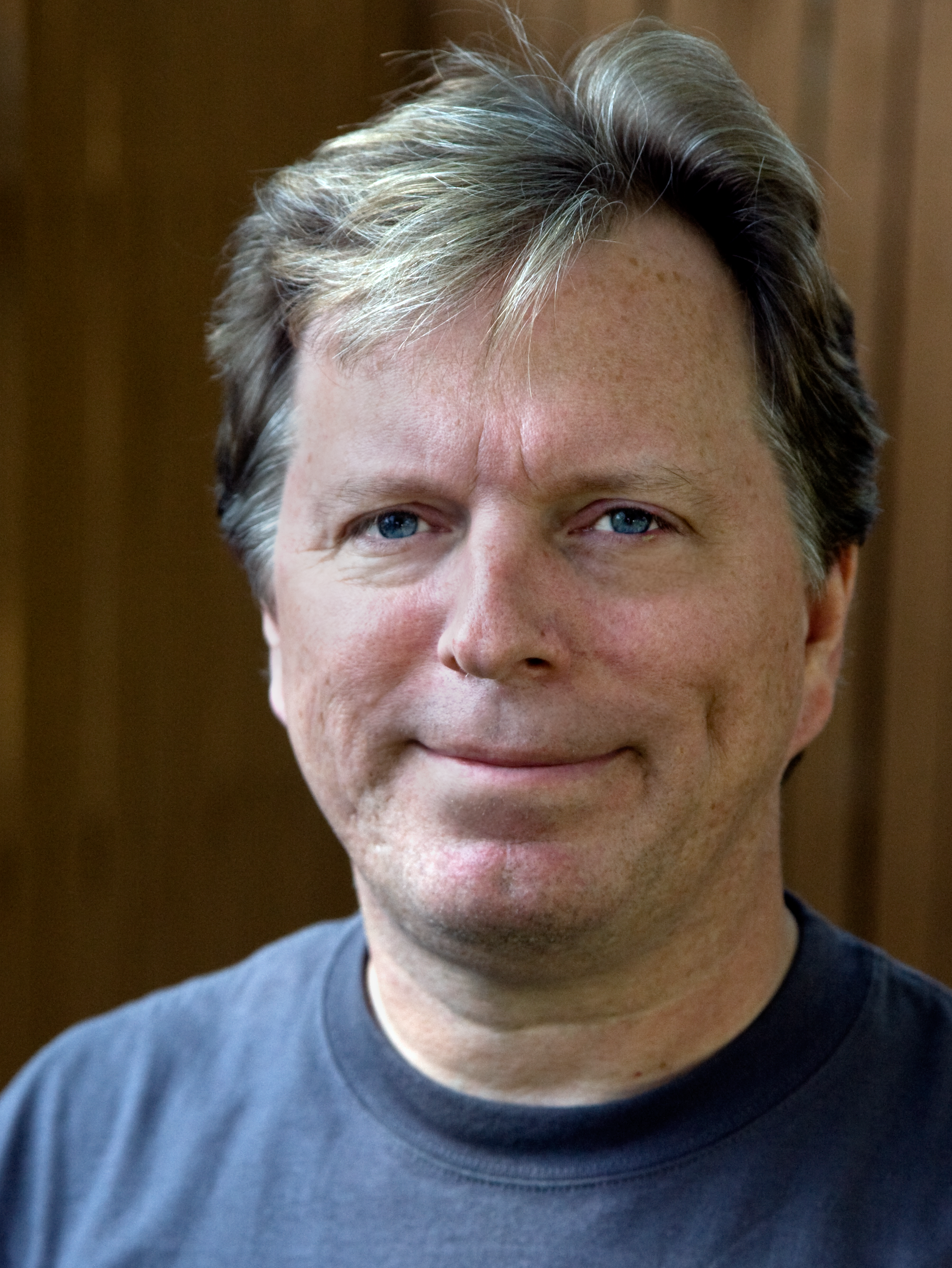
- Born: November 22, 1961 (age 64)
- Other name: merlyn (internet handle)
- Occupations: Programmer, Author, Instructor
- Employer(s): Stonehenge Consulting Services, Inc.
- Known for: Schwartzian transform
- Website: www.stonehenge.com/merlyn/

Randal L. Schwartz (born November 22, 1961), also known as merlyn, is an American author, system administrator and programming consultant. He has written several books on the Perl programming language, and plays a promotional role within the Perl community. He was a co-host of FLOSS Weekly.

In 1995, while working as a consultant for Intel, he cracked a number of passwords on the company's systems as part of a security review. He was convicted of hacking, sentenced to five years probation, and fined. The conviction was expunged in 2007.

== Career ==
Schwartz is the co-author of several widely used books about Perl, a programming language, and has written regular columns about Perl for several computer magazines, including UNIX Review, Web Techniques, and the Perl Journal. He popularized the Just another Perl hacker signature programs. He is a founding board member of the Perl Mongers, the worldwide Perl grassroots advocacy organization. He was a member of the Squeak Oversight Board, which oversees the Squeak programming language.

He has owned and operated Stonehenge Consulting Services, Inc. since 1985. After joining as co-host of FLOSS Weekly, a free software/open source (FLOSS) themed podcast in 2007, he assumed the role of host in 2010 until May 2020. He has done voice work for StarShipSofa, a science-fiction podcast.

Schwartz's name is also associated with the Schwartzian transform, an algorithm to efficiently sort a list according to a computation, without repeating the computation many times for each element of the list. He also coined the name spaceship operator for use in his teaching, because it reminded him of the spaceship in an HP BASIC Star Trek game.

Schwartz is a member of the F/OSS community, and has been named a "Perl Expert" and interviewed by numerous outlets—to discuss his views on Perl, Ruby, Smalltalk and other topics—including Dr. Dobb's, Paul dot Com Security TV, The Command Line, PerlCast, FLOSS Weekly, ONLamp.com, and InfoQ. Schwartz was also a speaker at the 2011 OSCON conference and a keynote speaker at the 2010 Texas LinuxFest conference.

His various books have been met with positive reviews.

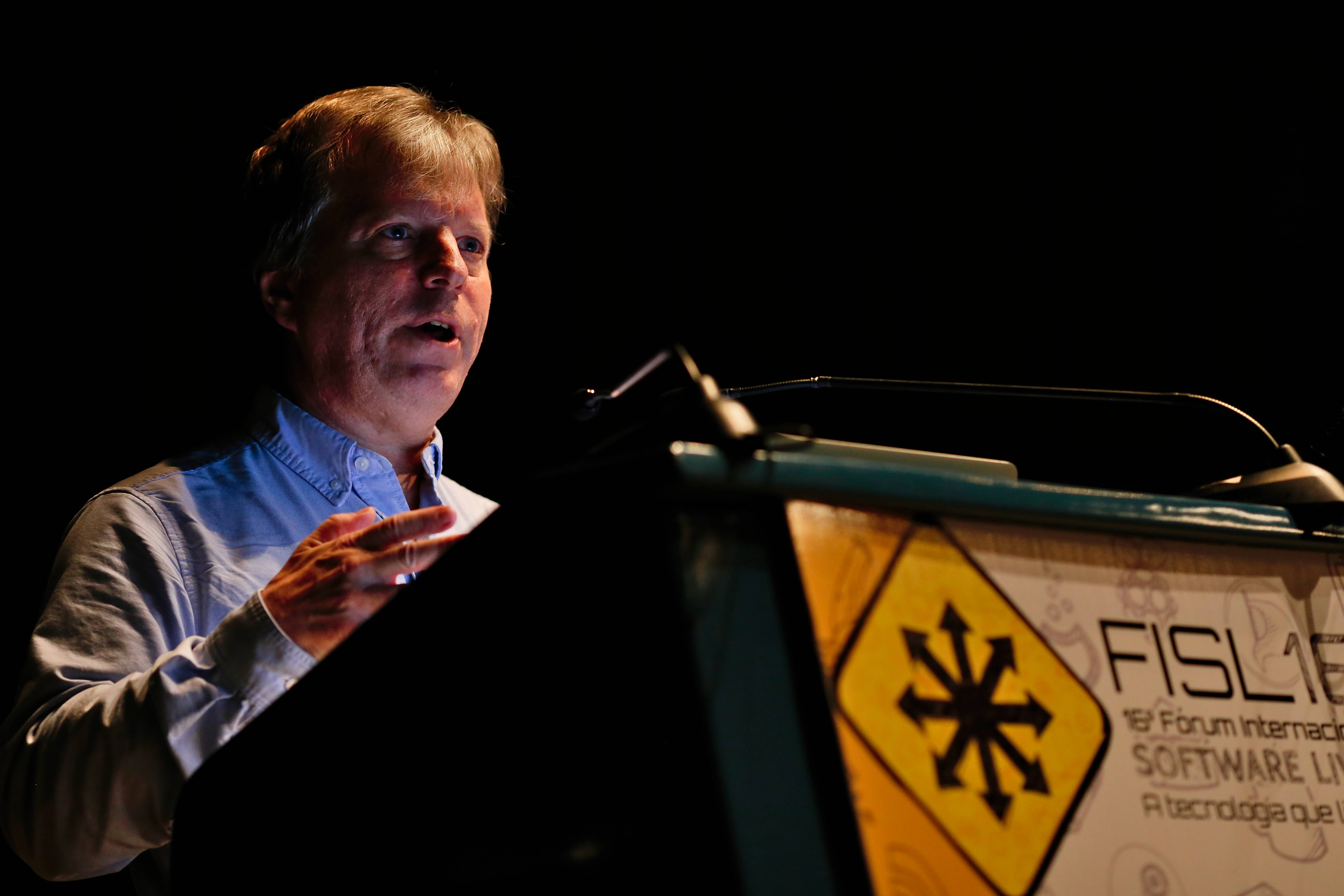
Schwartz giving a talk at FISL 16

=== Intel case ===
In July 1995, Schwartz was prosecuted in the case of State of Oregon vs. Randal Schwartz, which dealt with compromised computer security during his time as a system administrator for Intel. In the process of performing penetration testing, he cracked a number of passwords on Intel's systems. Schwartz was originally convicted on three felony counts, with one reduced to a misdemeanor, but on February 1, 2007, his arrest and conviction records were sealed through an official expungement, and he is legally no longer a felon.

== Bibliography ==
- Programming Perl, ISBN 0-937175-64-1; ISBN 1-56592-149-6 (2ed)
- Learning Perl, ISBN 1-56592-042-2; ISBN 1-56592-284-0 (2ed); ISBN 0-596-00132-0 (3ed); ISBN 0-596-10105-8 (4ed); ISBN 0-596-52010-7 (5ed); ISBN 1-4493-0358-7 (6ed) (2011); ISBN 1-4919-5432-9 (7ed) (2016)
- Intermediate Perl, ISBN 0-596-10206-2 (2006); ISBN 1-4493-9309-8 (2ed, 2012)
- Learning Perl on Win32 Systems, ISBN 1-56592-324-3
- Learning Perl Objects, References & Modules (2003), ISBN 0-596-00478-8
- Effective Perl Programming, ISBN 0-201-41975-0
- Preface for Object Oriented Perl, ISBN 1-884777-79-1
- Collected columns in Randal Schwartz's Perls of Wisdom, ISBN 1-59059-323-5
