= Lightweight markup language =

Markup language with simple, unobtrusive syntax

A lightweight markup language (LML), also termed a simple or humane markup language, is a markup language with simple, unobtrusive syntax. It is designed to be easy to write using any generic text editor and easy to read in its raw form. It is used in applications where it may be necessary to read the raw document and the final rendered output.

For instance, a person downloading a software library might prefer to read the documentation in a text editor rather than a web browser. Another use for such languages is to provide for data entry in web-based publishing, as in blogs and wikis, where the input interface is a simple text box. The server software then converts the input into a common document markup language like HTML.

== History ==
Lightweight markup languages were originally used on text-only displays which could not display characters in italics or bold, so informal methods to convey this information had to be developed. This formatting choice was naturally carried forth to plain-text email communications. Console browsers may also resort to similar display conventions.

In 1986 international standard SGML provided facilities to define and parse lightweight markup languages using grammars and tag implication. The 1998 W3C XML is a profile of SGML that omits these facilities. However, no SGML document type definition (DTD) for any of the languages listed below is known.

== Types ==
Lightweight markup languages can be categorized by their tag types. some languages use named elements that share a common format for start and end tags (e.g., MediaWiki <ref>'''source'''</ref>).

Most languages distinguish between markup for lines or blocks and for shorter spans of texts, but some only support inline markup.

Some markup languages are tailored for a specific purpose, such as documenting computer code (e.g., POD, reST, RD) or being converted to a certain output format (usually HTML or LaTeX) and nothing else, others are more general in application. For example, the Markdown language can be seen used on Github and Discord, where it is used for quickly formatting text. This includes whether they are oriented on textual presentation or on data serialization.

== Comparison of language features ==
Comparing language features
Language	HTML export tool	HTML import tool	Tables	Link titles	class attribute	id attribute	Release date
AsciiDoc	Yes	Yes	Yes	Yes	Yes	Yes	2002-11-25
BBCode	Yes	No	Yes	No	No	No	1998
Creole	No	No	Yes	No	No	No	2007-07-04
Djot	Yes	Yes	Yes	Yes	Yes	Yes	2022-07-30
DokuWiki	Yes	Yes/No	Yes	Yes	Yes/No	Yes/No	2004-07-04
Gemtext	Yes	Yes	No	Yes	No	No	2020
GitHub Flavored Markdown	Yes	No	Yes	Yes	No	No	2011-04-28+
Jira Formatting Notation	Yes	No	Yes	Yes	No	No	2002+
Markdown	Yes	Yes	No	Yes	Yes/No	Yes/No	2004-03-19
Markdown Extra	Yes	Yes	Yes	Yes	Yes	Yes	2013-04-11
MediaWiki	Yes	Yes	Yes	Yes	Yes	Yes	2002
MultiMarkdown	Yes	No	Yes	Yes	No	No	2009-07-13
Org-mode	Yes	Yes	Yes	Yes	Yes	Yes	2003
PmWiki	Yes	Yes	Yes	Yes	Yes	Yes	2002-01
POD	Yes	?	No	Yes	?	?	1994
reStructuredText	Yes	Yes	Yes	Yes	Yes	auto	2002-04-02
setext	Yes	Yes	No	Yes	No	No	1992
Slack	No	No	No	Yes	No	No	
txt2tags	Yes	Yes	Yes	Yes	Yes/No	Yes/No	2001-07-26
WhatsApp	No	No	No	No	No	No	2016-03-16

Markdown's own syntax does not support class attributes or id attributes; however, since Markdown supports the inclusion of native HTML code, these features can be implemented using direct HTML. (Some extensions may support these features.)

txt2tags' own syntax does not support class attributes or id attributes; however, since txt2tags supports inclusion of native HTML code in tagged areas, these features can be implemented using direct HTML when saving to an HTML target.

DokuWiki does not support HTML import natively, but HTML to DokuWiki converters and importers exist and are mentioned in the official documentation. DokuWiki does not support class or id attributes, but can be set up to support HTML code, which does support both features. HTML code support was built-in before release 2023-04-04. In later versions, HTML code support can be achieved through plug-ins, though it is discouraged.

== Comparison of implementation features ==
Comparing implementations, especially output formats
Language	Implementations	XHTML	Con/LaTeX	PDF	DocBook	ODF	EPUB	DOC(X)	LMLs	Other	License
AsciiDoc	Python, Ruby, JavaScript, Java	XHTML	LaTeX	PDF	DocBook	ODF	EPUB	No	—N/a	Man page, etc.	GNU GPL, MIT
BBCode	Perl, PHP, C#, Python, Ruby	(X)HTML	No	No	No	No	No	No	—N/a	—N/a	Public Domain
Creole	PHP, Python, Ruby, JavaScript	Depends on implementation									CC BY-SA 1.0
Djot	Lua (originally), JavaScript, PHP, Prolog, Rust	HTML	LaTeX, ConTeXt	PDF	DocBook	ODF	EPUB	RTF	MediaWiki, reST	Man page, S5 etc.	MIT
GitHub Flavored Markdown	Haskell (Pandoc)	HTML	LaTeX, ConTeXt	PDF	DocBook	ODF	EPUB	DOC	AsciiDoc, reST	OPML	GPL
GitHub Flavored Markdown	Java, JavaScript, PHP, Python, Ruby	HTML	No	No	No	No	No	No	—N/a	—N/a	Proprietary
Markdown	Perl (originally), C, Python, JavaScript, Haskell, Ruby, C#, Java, PHP	HTML	LaTeX, ConTeXt	PDF	DocBook	ODF	EPUB	RTF	MediaWiki, reST	Man page, S5 etc.	BSD-style & GPL (both)
Markdown Extra	PHP (originally), Python, Ruby	XHTML	No	No	No	No	No	No	—N/a	—N/a	BSD-style & GPL (both)
MediaWiki	Perl, PHP, Haskell, Python	XHTML	No	No	No	No	No	No	—N/a	—N/a	GNU GPL
MultiMarkdown	C, Perl	(X)HTML	LaTeX	PDF	No	ODF	No	DOC, RTF	—N/a	OPML	GPL, MIT
Org-mode	Emacs Lisp, Ruby (parser only), Perl, OCaml	XHTML	LaTeX	PDF	DocBook	ODF	EPUB	DOCX	Markdown	TXT, XOXO, iCalendar, Texinfo, man, contrib: groff, s5, deck.js, Confluence Wiki Markup, TaskJuggler, RSS, FreeMind	GPL
PmWiki	PHP	XHTML 1.0 Transitional, HTML5	No	PDF export addons	No	No	EPUB export addon	No	—N/a	—N/a	GNU GPL
POD	Perl	(X)HTML, XML	LaTeX	PDF	DocBook	No	No	RTF	—N/a	Man page, plain text	Artistic License, Perl's license
reStructuredText	Python, Haskell (Pandoc), Java	HTML, XML	LaTeX	PDF	DocBook	ODF	EPUB	DOC	—N/a	man, S5, Devhelp, Qt Help, CHM, JSON	Public Domain
Textile	PHP, JavaScript, Java, Perl, Python, Ruby, ASP, C#, Haskell	XHTML	No	No	No	No	No	No	—N/a	—N/a	Textile License
Texy!	PHP, C#, Java (Note: JTexy has full compatibility with Texy! 1.0 syntax and some compatibility with 2.0+.)	(X)HTML	No	No	No	No	No	No	—N/a	—N/a	GNU GPL v2 License
txt2tags	Python, PHP	(X)HTML, SGML	LaTeX	PDF	DocBook	ODF	EPUB	DOC	Creole, AsciiDoc, MediaWiki, MoinMoin, PmWiki, DokuWiki, Google Code Wiki	roff, man, MagicPoint, Lout, PageMaker, ASCII Art, TXT	GPL

== Comparison of lightweight markup language syntax ==
=== Inline span syntax ===
Although usually documented as yielding italic and bold text, most lightweight markup processors output semantic HTML elements em and strong instead. Monospaced text may either result in semantic code or presentational tt elements. Few languages make a distinction, e.g., Textile, or allow the user to configure the output easily, e.g., Texy.

LMLs sometimes differ for multi-word markup where some require the markup characters to replace the inter-word spaces (infix). Some languages require one character as prefix and suffix, others need two or even three, or support both with slightly different meaning, e.g., different levels of emphasis.

Comparison of text formatting syntax
HTML output	<strong>strongly emphasized</strong>	<em>emphasized text</em>	<code>code</code>	semantic
HTML output	<b>bold text</b>	<i>italic text</i>	<tt>monospace text</tt>	presentational
**AsciiDoc**	*bold text*	_italic text_	`monospace text`	Can double operators to apply formatting where there is no word boundary (for example **b**old t**ex**t yields **b**old t**ex**t).
**AsciiDoc**	*bold text*	'italic text' (Note: Deprecated in Asciidoctor 2.0; versions after this represent the current rendition of the language and are aligned to the standard which is still being produced as of April 2025. This syntax remains available through a compatibility mode.)	+monospace text+	Can double operators to apply formatting where there is no word boundary (for example **b**old t**ex**t yields **b**old t**ex**t).
BBCode	[b]bold text[/b]	[i]italic text[/i]	[code]monospace text[/code]	Formatting works across line breaks.
Creole	**bold text**	//italic text//	{{{monospace text}}}	Triple curly braces are for nowiki which is optionally monospace.
Djot	*bold text*	_italic text_	`monospace text`	
DokuWiki	**bold text**	//italic text//	<code>code</code>	
DokuWiki	**bold text**	//italic text//	''monospace text''	
Gemtext	—N/a	—N/a	```alt text monospace text ```	Text immediately following the first three backticks is alt-text.
Jira Formatting Notation	*bold text*	_italic text_	{{monospace text}}	
Markdown	**bold text**	*italic text*	`monospace text`	semantic HTML tags
Markdown	__bold text__	_italic text_	`monospace text`	semantic HTML tags
MediaWiki	'''bold text'''	''italic text''	<code>monospace text</code>	mostly resorts to inline HTML
Org-mode	*bold text*	/italic text/	=code=	
Org-mode	*bold text*	/italic text/	~verbatim~	
PmWiki	'''bold text'''	''italic text''	@@monospace text@@	
POD	B<bold text>	I<italic text>	C<monospace text>	Indented text is also shown as monospaced code.
reStructuredText	**bold text**	*italic text*	``monospace text``	
Setext	**bold text**	~italic text~	`monospace text`	
Slack	*bold text*	_italic text_	`monospace text`	```block of monospaced text```
Textile	*strong*	_emphasis_	@monospace text@	semantic HTML tags
Textile	**bold text**	__italic text__	@monospace text@	presentational HTML tags
Texy!	**bold text**	*italic text*	`monospace text`	semantic HTML tags by default, optional support for presentational tags
Texy!	**bold text**	//italic text//	`monospace text`	semantic HTML tags by default, optional support for presentational tags
TiddlyWiki	''bold text''	//italic text//	`monospace text`	
TiddlyWiki	''bold text''	//italic text//	``monospace text``	
txt2tags	**bold text**	//italic text//	``monospace text``	
WhatsApp	*bold text*	_italic text_	```monospace text```	

Gemtext does not have any inline formatting, monospaced text (called preformatted text in the context of Gemtext) must have the opening and closing ``` on their own lines.

==== Emphasis syntax ====
In HTML, text is emphasized with the <em> and <strong> element types, whereas <i> and <b> traditionally mark up text to be italicized or bold-faced, respectively.

Microsoft Word and Outlook, and accordingly other word processors and mail clients that strive for a similar user experience, support the basic convention of using asterisks for boldface and underscores for italic style. While Word removes the characters, Outlook retains them.

Italic type or normal emphasis
Code	AsciiDoc	ATX	Creole, DokuWiki	Jira	Markdown	MediaWiki	Org-mode	PmWiki	reST	Setext	Slack	Textile	Texy!	TiddlyWiki	txt2tags	WhatsApp
*italic*	No	No	No	No	Yes	No	No	No	Yes	No	No	No	Yes	No	No	No
**italic**	No	No	No	No	No	No	No	No	No	No	No	No	No	No	No	No
_italic_	Yes	Yes	No	Yes	Yes	No	No	No	No	No	Yes	Yes	No	No	No	Yes
__italic__	Yes	No	No	No	No	No	No	No	No	No	No	Yes	No	No	No	No
'italic'	Yes/No	No	No	No	No	No	No	No	No	No	No	No	No	No	No	No
''italic''	Yes/No	No	No	No	No	Yes	No	Yes	No	No	No	No	No	No	No	No
/italic/	No	No	No	No	No	No	Yes	No	No	No	No	No	No	No	No	No
//italic//	No	No	Yes	No	No	No	No	No	No	No	No	No	Yes	Yes	Yes	No
~italic~	No	No	No	No	No	No	No	No	No	Yes	No	No	No	No	No	No

Bold face or strong emphasis
Code	AsciiDoc	ATX	Creole, DokuWiki	Jira	Markdown	MediaWiki	Org-mode	PmWiki	reST	Setext	Slack	Textile	Texy!	TiddlyWiki	txt2tags	WhatsApp
*bold*	Yes	Yes	No	Yes	No	No	Yes	No	No	No	Yes	Yes	No	No	No	Yes
**bold**	Yes	No	Yes	No	Yes	No	No	No	Yes	Yes	No	Yes	Yes	No	Yes	No
__bold__	No	No	No	No	Yes	No	No	No	No	No	No	No	No	No	No	No
''bold''	No	No	No	No	No	No	No	No	No	No	No	No	No	Yes	No	No
'''bold'''	No	No	No	No	No	Yes	No	Yes	No	No	No	No	No	No	No	No

==== Editorial syntax ====
In HTML, removed or deleted and inserted text is marked up with the <del> and <ins> element types, respectively. However, legacy element types <s> or <strike> and <u> are still also available for stricken and underlined spans of text.

Underlined or inserted text
Language Code	DokuWiki	Jira	Markdown	Org-mode	Setext	Texy!	TiddlyWiki	txt2tags
_underline_	No	No	Optional	Yes	Yes	No	No	No
__underline__	Yes	No	Optional	No	No	No	Yes	Yes
+underline+	No	Yes	No	No	No	No	No	No
++underline++	No	No	No	No	No	Yes	No	No

AsciiDoc, ATX, Creole, MediaWiki, PmWiki, reST, Slack, Textile and WhatsApp do not support dedicated markup for underlining text. Textile does, however, support insertion via the +inserted+ syntax.

Strike-through or deleted text
Language Code	Jira	Markdown	Org-mode	Slack	Textile	Texy	TiddlyWiki	txt2tags	WhatsApp
~stricken~	No	No	No	Yes	No	No	No	No	Yes
~~stricken~~	No	GFM	No	No	No	No	Yes	No	No
+stricken+	No	No	Yes	No	No	No	No	No	No
-stricken-	Yes	No	No	No	Yes	No	No	No	No
--stricken--	No	No	No	No	No	Yes	No	Yes	No

ATX, Creole, MediaWiki, PmWiki, reST and Setext do not support dedicated markup for striking through text.

DokuWiki supports HTML-like <del>stricken</del> syntax, even with embedded HTML disabled.

AsciiDoc supports stricken text through a built-in text span (Note: Text spans in AsciiDoc are termed quoted text attributes in legacy implementations.) prefix: [.line-through]#stricken#.

==== Programming syntax ====
Quoted computer code is traditionally presented in typewriter-like fonts where each character occupies the same fixed width. HTML offers the semantic <code> and the deprecated, presentational <tt> element types for this task.

Monospaced font, teletype text or code
Code	AsciiDoc	ATX	Creole	Gemtext	Jira	Markdown	Org-mode	PmWiki	reST	Slack	Textile	Texy!	TiddlyWiki	txt2tags	WhatsApp
@code@	No	No	No	No	No	No	No	No	No	No	Yes	No	No	No	No
@@code@@	No	No	No	No	No	No	No	Yes	No	No	No	No	No	No	No
`code`	Yes	No	No	No	No	Yes	No	No	No	Yes	No	Yes	Yes	No	Yes
``code``	Yes	No	No	No	No	Yes	No	No	Yes	No	No	No	Yes	Yes	No
```code```	No	No	No	Yes	No	Yes	No	No	No	Yes/No	No	No	Yes	No	No
=code=	No	No	No	No	No	No	Yes	No	No	No	No	No	No	No	No
~code~	No	No	No	No	No	No	Yes	No	No	No	No	No	No	No	No
+code+	Yes/No	No	No	No	No	No	No	No	No	No	No	No	No	No	No
++code++	Yes/No	No	No	No	No	No	No	No	No	No	No	No	No	No	No
{{code}}	No	No	No	No	Yes	No	No	No	No	No	No	No	No	No	No
{{{code}}}	No	No	Yes	No	No	No	No	No	No	No	No	No	No	No	No
|code|	No	Yes	No	No	No	No	No	No	No	No	No	No	No	No	No
;;code;;															

Mediawiki and Gemtext do not provide lightweight markup for inline code spans.

=== Heading syntax ===
Headings are usually available in up to six levels, but the top one is often reserved to contain the same as the document title, which may be set externally. Some documentation may associate levels with divisional types, e.g., part, chapter, section, article or paragraph. This article uses 1 as the top level, but index of heading levels may begin at 1 or 0 in official documentation.

Most LMLs follow one of two styles for headings, either Setext-like underlines or atx-like line markers, or they support both.

==== Underlined headings ====
Level 1 Heading
===============

Level 2 Heading
---------------

Level 3 Heading
~~~~~~~~~~~~~~~

The first style uses underlines, i.e., repeated characters (e.g., equals =, hyphen - or tilde ~, usually at least two or four times) in the line below the heading text.

Underlined heading levels
Character Language	=	-	~	*	#	+	^	_	:	"	'	`	.	Min. length
AsciiDoc	1	2	3	No	No	5	4	No	No	No	No	No	No	2 (Note: Width of title ± 2 characters)
Markdown	1	2	No	No	No	No	No	No	No	No	No	No	No	1
reStructuredText	Heading structure is determined dynamically from the succession of headings													heading width
Setext	1	2	No	No	No	No	No	No	No	No	No	No	No	?
Texy!	3	4	No	2	1	No	No	No	No	No	No	No	No	3

Headings may optionally be overline in reStructuredText, in addition to being underlined.

==== Prefixed headings ====
# Level 1 Heading
## Level 2 Heading ##
### Level 3 Heading ###

The second style is based on repeated markers (e.g., hash #, equals = or asterisk *) at the start of the heading itself, where the number of repetitions indicates the (sometimes inverse) heading level. Most languages also support the reduplication of the markers at the end of the line, but whereas some make them mandatory, others do not even expect their numbers to match.

Line prefix (and suffix) headings
Character Language	=	#	*	!	+	Suffix	Levels	Indentation
AsciiDoc	Yes	No	No	No	No	Optional	1–6	No
Creole	Yes	No	No	No	No	Optional	1–6	No
DokuWiki	Yes	No	No	No	No	Yes	6-1	No
Gemtext	No	Yes	No	No	No	?	1–3	No
Markdown	No	Yes	No	No	No	Optional	1–6	No
MediaWiki	Yes	No	No	No	No	Yes	1–6	No
Org-mode	No	No	Yes	No	No	No	1– +∞	alternative
PmWiki	No	No	No	Yes	No	Optional	1–6	No
Texy!	Yes	Yes	No	No	No	Optional	6–1, dynamic	No
TiddlyWiki	No	No	No	Yes	No	No	1–6	No
txt2tags	Yes	No	No	No	Yes	Yes	1–6	No

Org-mode supports indentation as a means of indicating the level.

BBCode does not support section headings at all.

POD and Textile choose the HTML convention of numbered heading levels instead.

Other heading formats
Language
Format
POD

=head1 Level 1 Heading
=head2 Level 2 Heading

Jira, Textile

h1. Level 1 Heading
h2. Level 2 Heading
h3. Level 3 Heading
h4. Level 4 Heading
h5. Level 5 Heading
h6. Level 6 Heading

Microsoft Word supports auto-formatting paragraphs as headings if they do not contain more than a handful of words, no period at the end and the user hits the enter key twice. For lower levels, the user may press the tabulator key the according number of times before entering the text, i.e., one through eight tabs for heading levels two through nine.

=== Link syntax ===
Hyperlinks can either be added inline, which may clutter the code because of long URLs, or with named alias or numbered id references to lines containing nothing but the address and related attributes and often may be located anywhere in the document. Most languages allow the author to specify text Text to be displayed instead of the plain address http://example.com and some also provide methods to set a different link title Title which may contain more information about the destination.

LMLs that are tailored for special setups, e.g., wikis or code documentation, may automatically generate named anchors (for headings, functions etc.) inside the document, link to related pages (possibly in a different namespace) or provide a textual search for linked keywords.

Most languages employ (double) square or angular brackets to surround links, but hardly any two languages are completely compatible. Many can automatically recognize and parse absolute URLs inside the text without further markup.

Hyperlink syntax
Languages	Basic syntax	Text syntax	Title syntax
AsciiDoc	http://example.com[Text]	http://example.com	
BBCode, Creole, MediaWiki, PmWiki	http://example.com[Text]		
Slack	http://example.com[Text]	<http://example.com|Text>	
Textile	http://example.com[Text]	"Text":http://example.com	"Text (Title)":http://example.com
Texy!	http://example.com[Text]	"Text":http://example.com	"Text .(Title)":http://example.com
Jira	[http://example.com]	[Text|http://example.com]	
MediaWiki	[http://example.com]	[http://example.com Text]	
txt2tags	[http://example.com]	[Text http://example.com]	
Creole, MediaWiki, PmWiki, DokuWiki	[[Name]]	[[Name|Text]]	
Org-mode	[[Name]]	[[Name][Text]]	
TiddlyWiki	[[Name]]	[[Text|Name]]	
Creole	[[Namespace:Name]]	[[Namespace:Name|Text]]	
Org-mode	[[Namespace:Name]]	[[Namespace:Name][Text]]	
Creole, PmWiki	[[http://example.com]]	[[http://example.com|Text]]	
BBCode	[url]http://example.com[/url]	[url=http://example.com]Text[/url]	
Markdown	<http://example.com>	[Text](http://example.com)	[Text](http://example.com "Title")
reStructuredText	<http://example.com>	`Text <http://example.com/>`_	
Gemtext	=> gemini://example.com	=> gemini://example.com Text	
POD	L<http://example.com/>	L</Name>	
setext		^.. _Link_name URL	

Gemtext and setext links must be on a line by themselves, they cannot be used inline.

Reference syntax
Languages	Text syntax	Title syntax
AsciiDoc	… [[id]] … <<id>>	… [[id]] … <<id,Text>>
AsciiDoc	… anchor:id … xref:id	… anchor:id … xref:id[Text]
Markdown	… [Text][id] … [id]: http://example.com	… [Text][id] … [id]: http://example.com "Title"
Markdown	… [Text][] … [Text]: http://example.com	… [Text][] … [Text]: http://example.com "Title"
Markdown	… [Text] … [Text]: http://example.com	… [Text] … [Text]: http://example.com "Title"
reStructuredText	… Name_ … .. _Name: http://example.com	
setext	… Link_name_ … ^.. _Link_name URL	
Textile	… "Text":alias … [alias]http://example.com	… "Text":alias … [alias (Title)]http://example.com
Texy!	… "Text":alias … [alias]: http://example.com	… "Text":alias … [alias]: http://example.com .(Title)

Org-mode's normal link syntax does a text search of the file. You can also put in dedicated targets with <<id>>.

=== List syntax ===
HTML requires an explicit element for the list, specifying its type, and one for each list item, but most lightweight markup languages need only different line prefixes for the bullet points or enumerated items. Some languages rely on indentation for nested lists, others use repeated parent list markers.

Unordered, bullet list items
Character Language	*	-	+	#	.	·	•	_	:	–	—	indent	skip	nest
AsciiDoc	Yes	Yes	No	No	No	No	No	No	No	No	No	0 (Note: Indenting by a single whitepace in AsciiDoc will preformat the text of that line.)	?	repeat or alternate the marker
DokuWiki	Yes	No	No	No	No	No	No	No	No	No	No	2+	0+	indent
Gemtext	Yes	No	No	No	No	No	No	No	No	No	No	0	1+	—N/a
Jira	Yes	Yes	No	No	No	No	No	No	No	No	No	0	1+	repeat
Markdown	Yes	Yes	Yes	No	No	No	No	No	No	No	No	0–3	1–3	indent
MediaWiki, TiddlyWiki	Yes	No	No	No	No	No	No	No	No	No	No	0	1+	repeat
Org-mode	Yes	Yes	Yes	No	No	No	No	No	No	No	No	0+		indent
Textile	Yes	No	No	No	No	No	No	No	No	No	No	0	1+	repeat
Texy!	Yes	Yes	Yes	No	No	No	No	No	No	No	No	2+	?	indent

Microsoft Word automatically converts paragraphs that start with an asterisk *, hyphen-minus - or greater-than bracket > followed by a space or horizontal tabulator as bullet list items. It will also start an enumerated list for the digit 1 and the case-insensitive letters a (for alphabetic lists) or i (for roman numerals), if they are followed by a period ., a closing round parenthesis ), a greater-than sign > or a hyphen-minus - and a space or tab; in case of the round parenthesis an optional opening one ( before the list marker is also supported.

Languages differ on whether they support optional or mandatory digits in numbered list items, which kinds of enumerators they understand (e.g., decimal digit 1, roman numerals i or I, alphabetic letters a or A) and whether they support to keep explicit values in the output format. Some Markdown dialects, for instance, will respect a start value other than 1, but ignore any other explicit value.

Ordered, enumerated list items
Character Language	+	#	-	.	#1	1.	1)	1]	1}	(1)	[1]	{1}	a.	A.	i.	I.	indent	skip	nest
AsciiDoc	No	No	No	Yes	No	Yes	No	No	No	No	No	No	Yes (Note: The modern language specification only supports a full stop as a delimiter for any ordered list. In the legacy AsciiDoc.py syntax, only a right parenthesis was acceptable for either lower alpha or Roman numerals.)				0	?	repeat or alternate the marker
DokuWiki	No	No	Yes	No	No	No	No	No	No	No	No	No	No	No	No	No	2+	0+	indent
Jira, MediaWiki, Textile, TiddlyWiki	No	Yes	No	No	No	No	No	No	No	No	No	No	No	No	No	No	0	1+	repeat
Markdown	No	No	No	No	No	Yes	Yes	No	No	No	No	No	No	No	No	No	0–3	1–3	indent
Org-mode	No	No	No	No	No	Yes	Yes	No	No	No	No	No	Optional		No	No	0+		indent
Texy!	No	No	No	No	No	Yes	Yes	No	No	No	No	No	Only with ) delimiter		No	Only with ) delimiter	2+	?	indent

Slack assists the user in entering enumerated and bullet lists, but does not actually format them as such, i.e., it just includes a leading digit followed by a period and a space or a bullet character • in front of a line.

Labeled, glossary, description/definition list syntax
Languages	Term being defined	Definition of the term
AsciiDoc	Term::	No specific requirements; may be mixed with ordered or unordered lists, with nesting optional
AsciiDoc	Term::::	No specific requirements; may be mixed with ordered or unordered lists, with nesting optional
AsciiDoc	Term;;	No specific requirements; may be mixed with ordered or unordered lists, with nesting optional
MediaWiki	; Term	: Definition
Textile	; Term	: Definition
TiddlyWiki	; Term	: Definition
Texy!	Term:  - Definition	
Org-mode	Term :: Definition	

== Historical formats ==
The following lightweight markup languages, while similar to some of those already mentioned, have not yet been added to the comparison tables in this article:

- EtText: circa 2000.
- Grutatext: circa 2002.

== See also ==
- Comparison of document-markup languages
- Comparison of documentation generators
- Lightweight programming language
