= Ikiwiki =

Free and open-source wiki application

ikiwiki
- Developer: Joey Hess et al
- Release: April 29, 2006; 20 years ago
- Stable release: 3.20260201 / 2026-02-01[±]
- Written in: Perl
- Operating system: Unix-like
- Type: Wiki software
- License: GPL v2 or later
- Website: ikiwiki.info
- Repository: source.ikiwiki.branchable.com?p=source.git%3Ba%3Dsummary

ikiwiki is a free and open-source wiki application, designed by Joey Hess. It is licensed under the terms of the GNU General Public License, version 2 or later. ikiwiki is written in Perl, although external plugins can be implemented in any language.

Unlike conventional wiki software, ikiwiki stores its pages in a standard version control system such as Git, Subversion or others.

== Features ==
ikiwiki supports several lightweight markup languages, including Markdown, Creole, reStructuredText and Textile.

In the simplest case, it can function as an off-line static web site generator (possibly still allowing different users to submit changes through VCS; this method is sometimes referred to as wiki compiler), but it can use CGI to function as a normal web-interfaced wiki as well. Login via OpenID is supported.

ikiwiki can be used for maintaining a blog, and includes common blogging functionality such as comments and RSS feeds. The installer includes an option to set up a simple blog at install time.

ikiwiki is included in various Linux distributions, including Debian and Ubuntu.

== See also ==
- Website Meta Language
