= Chris Richmond (entrepreneur) =

American businessman (born 1986)

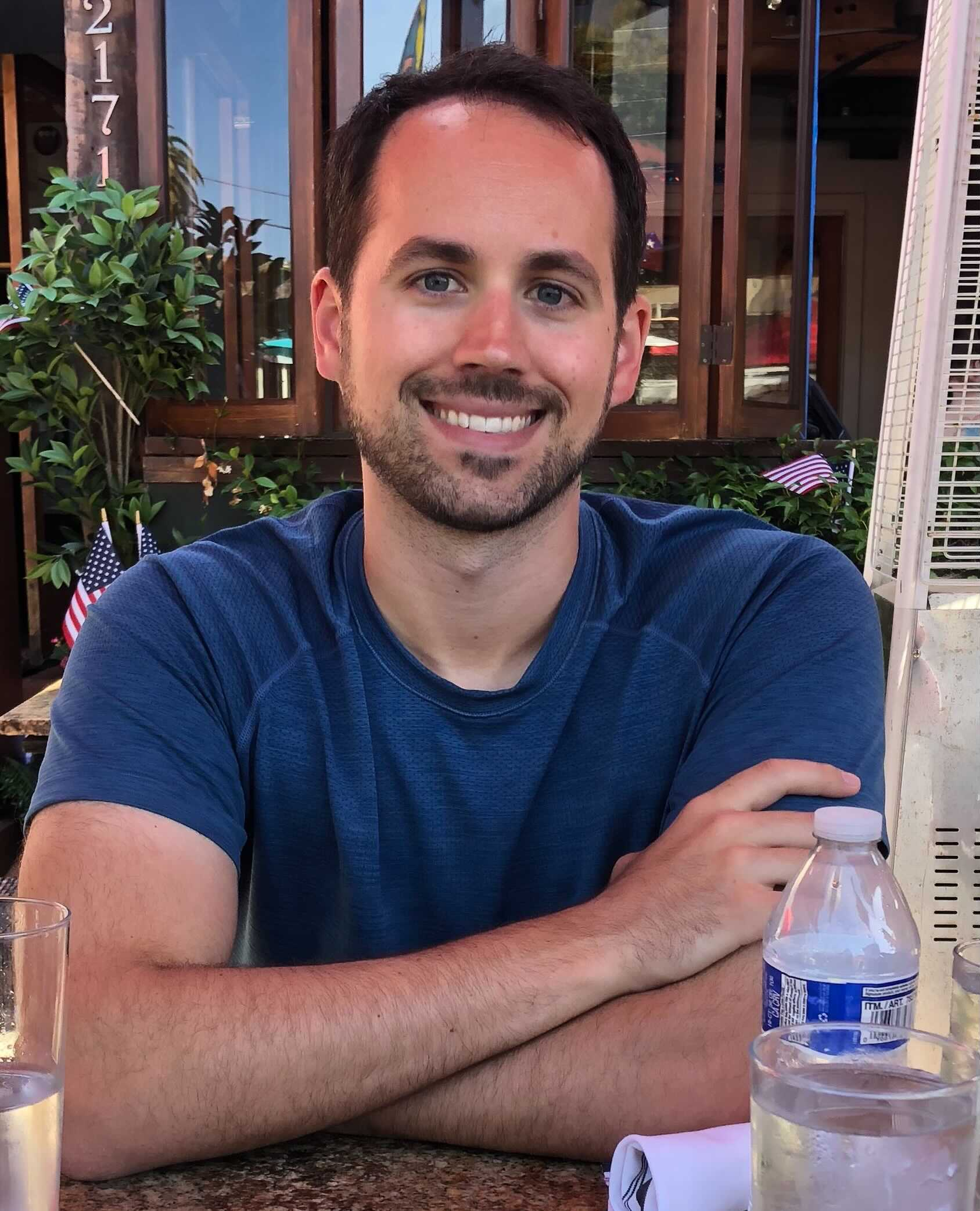
- Born: Christopher Richmond; July 29, 1986 (age 40); Oakland, California, U.S.
- Occupations: CEO of Snopes; CEO of TV Tropes

Chris Richmond (born July 29, 1986) is an American businessman and entrepreneur. He founded a television streaming site called ShareTV.com, co-founded an adtech platform called Proper Media and acquired websites such as TV Tropes, Snopes, and Salon.com.

== Career ==
Richmond founded his first large website in 2007, ShareTV.com, which became one of the first online distribution partners of Hulu and TheWB and was one of first sites to stream the Oscars online.

In 2014, Richmond, along with his business partner Drew Schoentrup, acquired TV Tropes, a wiki geared toward fiction writers. To announce the purchase, Richmond and Schoentrup launched a Kickstarter campaign to ask the members for their help in improving the project that raised more than $100,000.

In 2015, Richmond co-founded an adtech platform called Proper Media and acquired part of Snopes.com.

In 2018, Richmond helped with his 3rd acquisition by acquiring Spoutable.com under Proper Media. Proper Media announced that the acquisition added eight employees and nearly doubled its reach.

In 2019, Richmond and his business partner acquired Salon.com for $5 million from Salon Media Group (OTCQB: SLNM); Salon.com had been nearing bankruptcy for two decades. Nobody was laid off from the newsroom under Richmond and Schoentrup's tenure.

In 2021, after 6 years with Richmond as CEO, Proper Media was sold to Sovereign Holdings. The terms of the acquisition were not disclosed.

In 2023, Richmond and Schoentrup sold Salon.com for an undisclosed sum.

== Cybersquatting case ==
Richmond started out at ShareTV.org and was completely unable to obtain the commercial equivalent, ShareTV.com, from a cybersquatter. In 2013, Richmond won a lawsuit for ShareTV.com against the cybersquatter, despite the fact that they owned the domain seven years before ShareTV began its trademark.

== Snopes.com lawsuit ==
Proper Media's first official client was Snopes.com, the fact-checking website. After a year, Proper Media purchased a significant stake in Snopes.com.

A legal dispute over whether Proper Media purchased 40% or 50% of Snopes.com started in 2017. During the dispute, Proper Media withheld ad revenue from Snopes.com, and its founder David Mikkelson launched a GoFundMe campaign to keep the site running. The dispute resolved in 2022, when Richmond and Schoentrup bought out all other shareholders of Snopes, after which Richmond became CEO.
