= MMD =

MMD may refer to:

== Science and technology ==
- Molar mass distribution, in a polymer
- MultiMarkdown, a markup language
- Multiple dispatch, a feature of some programming languages
- MMD, a loudspeaker parameter of the Thiele/Small model equivalent
- MDIO Manageable Devices, target devices that are being managed by the Management Data Clock in Management Data Input/Output (MDIO)
- Mass median diameter, in particle-size distribution

== Organisations ==
- Mercury Musical Developments, an arts organisation in the United Kingdom
- Movement for Multi-Party Democracy, a Zambian political party
- Microwave Measurements Division, of Anritsu corporation
- Multimedia Displays, a company of TPV Technology

== Other uses ==
- 2500 in Roman numerals
- Merchant Mariner's Document
- Mid Manair Dam, a dam located in Telangana, India
- MikuMikuDance, a free 3D dance animation program
- Minami-Daito Airport (IATA code)
- Municipal Market Data, a yield curve of AAA-rated bonds issued by U.S. states
- Murder mystery dinner
- Michelle Marquez Dee (born 1995), Filipino actress, beauty pageant titleholder and the daughter of Miss International 1979, Melanie Marquez
- A US Navy hull classification symbol: Fast minelayer (MMD)

== See also ==
- Mini-Micro Designer 1 (MMD-1), a type of single-board computer
