= List of markup languages =

This is a list of markup languages. This page directly lists markup languages that have not yet been assigned to more specific categories. However, many specific markup language are instead listed only under the narrower lists referenced below.

== Business, economy, and finance ==
- (Business Narrative Markup Language)
- BPML (Business Process Modeling Language)
- FpML (Financial Product Markup Language)
- XBRL (eXtensible Business Reporting Language)

== Culture, media, and entertainment ==
- BulletML
- OBML (Opera Binary Markup Language)
- SMIL (Synchronized Multimedia Integration Language)
- Fountain
- Markdown
- Wiki Markup Language
- HyperText Markup Language (HTML)

== Science, technology, engineering, and mathematics ==
- CFML (ColdFusion Markup Language)
- Emotion Markup Language
- GolfML
- InkML
- Keyhole Markup Language - .kmz file format
- Meta Content Framework
- MathML
- Nytril (Document Programming Language)
- Parameter Value Language
- Serializations of RDF (Resource Description Framework) like RDF/XML and RDF/N3
- SBML (Systems Biology Markup Language)
- SML (Spacecraft Markup Language)
- VoiceXML
- VHML (Virtual Human Markup Language)
- XBEL (XML Bookmark Exchange Language)
- XBL (eXtensible Bindings Language)
- XMPP (Extensible Messaging and Presence Protocol)

== Types with their own lists ==
- List of document markup languages—This term is often used synonymously with "markup language", presumably because document can refer to any written or recorded representation.
- List of XML markup languages -- XML itself is properly a meta-language used to define other markup languages.
- List of general purpose markup languages
- List of content syndication markup languages
- List of lightweight markup languages
- List of user interface markup languages
- List of vector graphics markup languages

== See also ==
- HTML - Hyper Text Markup Language
- List of programming languages by type
