= Txt2tags =

Software to generate documents

txt2tags
- Original author: Aurelio Jargas
- Developer: txt2tags Team
- Initial release: July 26, 2001; 24 years ago
- Stable release: 3.9 / 6 October 2023; 2 years ago
- Written in: Python
- Type: lightweight markup language
- License: GNU General Public License
- Website: Official website
- Repository: github.com/txt2tags/txt2tags

txt2tags is a document generator software that uses a lightweight markup language. txt2tags is free software under GNU General Public License.

Written in Python, it can export documents to several formats including: HTML, XHTML, SGML, LaTeX, Lout, roff, MediaWiki, Google Code Wiki, DokuWiki, MoinMoin, MagicPoint, PageMaker and plain text.

== Syntax examples ==
**bold text**
//italic text//
`monospace text`
__underlined__
--strike-through--

= Level 1 Header =
== Level 2 Header ==
=== Level 3 Header ===

[Link text www.example.com]

== See also ==
- Comparison of documentation generators
- Comparison of document markup languages
