= Comparison of document markup languages =

The following tables compare general and technical information for a number of document markup languages. Please see the individual markup languages' articles for further information.

== General information ==
Basic general information about the markup languages: creator, version, etc.

Language	First public release date	Creator	Editor	Viewer
AsciiDoc	2002	Stuart Rackham	Text editor	Output to XHTML, HTML, DocBook (which can convert to PDF, EPUB, DVI, LaTeX, roff, and PostScript)
Computable Document Format	2010	Wolfram Research	Wolfram Language & Mathematica	CDF Player; CDF format can also be embedded in web pages viewable with conventional browsers.
Creole	2007		Text editor	Output to HTML, RTF, LaTeX, others; renderers for MFC, others.
Darwin Information Typing Architecture (DITA)	2005	IBM, OASIS	Text/XML editor	Output to HTML, PDF, CHM, javadoc, others.
DocBook	1992	The Davenport Group, OASIS	XML editor	Output to HTML, PDF, CHM, javadoc, others.
Encoded Archival Description (EAD)	1998	Berkeley Project	Text editor	Web browser
Extensible HyperText Markup Language (XHTML)	2000 (January 26)	W3C	Text/XML editor, HTML editor	Web browser
Halibut	1999	Simon Tatham	Text editor	Output to ASCII text, HTML, PDF, PostScript, Unix man pages, GNU Info, Windows Help (.CHM files), Windows WinHelp (old .HLP files)
HyperText Markup Language (HTML)	1993	Tim Berners-Lee	Text editor, HTML editor	Web browser
LilyPond	1996	Han-Wen Nienhuys, Jan Nieuwenhuizen	Text editor, Scorewriter	Output to DVI, PDF, PostScript, PNG, others.
Maker Interchange Format (MIF)	1986	Frame Technology acquired by Adobe Systems in 1995	Text editor, FrameMaker	FrameMaker
MakeDoc	2000	Carl Sassenrath	Text editor	Web browser (XHTML or HTML output)
Markdown	2004	John Gruber	Text editor, E-mail client	Web browser (XHTML or HTML output), preview in gedit-markdown-plugin
Math Markup Language (MathML)	1999 (July)	W3C	Text/XML editor, TeX converter	Web browser, Word processor
The Music Encoding Initiative (MEI)	1999	The MEI Community	XML editor	Verovio
Music Extensible Markup Language (MusicXML)	2002	Recordare	Scorewriter	Scorewriter
MyST Markdown	2019	ExecutableBooks team	Text editor	Output to Word processor, LaTeX, PDF, Markdown.
Nytril	2026	Shawn McCreight, John Colbert	Text editor, Nytril IDE	Output to UTF8 text, HTML, PDF, Microsoft_Word, LaTeX
Office Open XML (OOXML)	2006	Ecma International, ISO/IEC	Office suite	Office suite
OpenDocument Format (ODF)	2005	OASIS, ISO/IEC	Office suite	Office suite
Open Mathematical Documents (OMDoc)	2000	Michael Kohlhase	Text/XML editor	Output to XHTML+MathML, TeX, others.
Org-mode	2003	Org-mode project	Emacs, text editor	Emacs. Output to HTML, PDF, DocBook, FreeMind, OpenDocument Format (ODF), others.
reStructuredText	2001	David Goodger	Text editor	Output to HTML, LaTeX, PDF, Unix man pages, ODT, S5 (HTML Slide Shows), XML, others.
Scalable Vector Graphics (SVG)	2004	W3C	Vector graphics editor	Web browser, etc.
Script GML	1968; 1971	IBM	Text editor	GDDM, AFP viewer
TeX LaTeX	1978; 1984	Donald Knuth; Leslie Lamport	Text editor	DVI or Portable Document Format (PDF) converter
Texinfo	1986	Richard Stallman	Text editor	output to DVI, Portable Document Format (PDF), HTML, DocBook, others.
TeXmacs format	1998	Joris van der Hoeven	Text editor/TeXmacs editor	PDF or PostScript files. Converters exist for TeX/LaTeX and XHTML+Mathml
Textile	2002	Dean Allen	Text editor	Web browser (XHTML or HTML output), reference and tester (uses latest PHP-Textile version 3.5.5)
Text Encoding Initiative (TEI)	1990	Text Encoding Initiative Consortium	Text/XML editor	Web Browser (using XHTML), PDF, Word Processor (using ODF) or EPUB
troff (typesetter runoff) groff (GNU runoff)	1973; 1990	Joe Ossanna	Text editor	groffer, or output to PostScript
Wireless Markup Language (WML)	1999	WAP Forum	Text/XML editor	Mobile browser
Language	First public release date	Creator	Editor	Viewer

Note: While Rich Text Format (RTF) is human readable, it is not considered to be a markup language and is thus excluded from the table.

== Characteristics ==
Some characteristics of the markup languages.

Language	Major purpose	Based on	Markup type	Structural markup	Presentational markup	Open format
AsciiDoc	Multi-purpose		Tag	Yes	Yes	Yes
Computable Document Format	Interactive technical documents, infographics, blogs	Wolfram Language	Tag	Yes	Yes	No
Darwin Information Typing Architecture (DITA)	Technical documents	XML	Tag	Yes	Yes	Yes
DocBook	Technical documents	SGML / XML	Tag	Yes	Yes	Yes
Encoded Archival Description (EAD)	Finding aids	XML	Tag	Yes	No	
Extensible HyperText Markup Language (XHTML)	Hypertext documents	XML	Tag	Yes	Yes	Yes
FictionBook	Multi-purpose	XML	Tag	Yes	Yes	Yes
Halibut	Technical documents		Control code	Yes	Yes	Yes
HyperText Markup Language (HTML)	Hypertext documents	SGML	Tag	Yes	Yes	Yes
Lilypond	Music notation		Control code	Yes	Yes	
Maker Interchange Format (MIF)	Technical documents		Tag	Yes	Yes	
Markdown	Formatted technical documents, hypertext documents, e-mail	Text e-mail conventions	Tag	Yes	Yes	Yes
Math Markup Language (MathML)	Mathematical documents	XML	Tag	Yes	Yes	
The Music Encoding Initiative (MEI)	Music notation	XML	Tag	Yes	Yes	
Music Extensible Markup Language (MusicXML)	Music notation	XML	Tag	Yes	Yes	Yes
Nytril	Formatted technical documents		Control code	Yes	Yes	Yes
Office Open XML (OOXML)	Multi-purpose	XML / ZIP	Tag	Yes	Yes	Yes
OpenDocument Format (ODF)	Multi-purpose	XML / ZIP	Tag	Yes	Yes	Yes
Open Mathematical Document (OMDoc)	Mathematical documents	XML	Tag	Yes	Yes	
Org-mode	Multi-purpose (notes, project management, publishing, literate programming)	Text outliner	Tag	Yes	Yes	
reStructuredText	Technical and multi-purpose documents	Structured text and Setext	Tag	Yes	Yes	Yes
Scalable Vector Graphics (SVG)	2D vector graphics	XML	Tag	Yes	Yes	Yes
Script GML	Multi-purpose	RUNOFF	Control code	Yes	Yes	
TeX LaTeX	Academic documents, multi-purpose		Control code	Yes	Yes	
Texinfo	Technical documents	TeX, Scribe	Control code	Yes	Yes	
TeXmacs format	Academic documents	tree	Tag	Yes	Yes	
Textile	Hypertext documents	AsciiDoc (based on some similarities and dates of release)	Tag	Yes	Yes	Yes
Text Encoding Initiative (TEI)	Academic, linguistic, literary and technical documents	SGML / XML	Tag	Yes	No	
troff (typesetter runoff), groff (GNU runoff)	Technical documents	RUNOFF	Control code	Yes	Yes	
Wireless Markup Language (WML)	Hypertext documents	XML	Tag	Yes	Yes	
Language	Major purpose	Based on	Markup type	Structural markup	Presentational markup	Open format

== See also ==
- List of document markup languages
- Comparison of Office Open XML and OpenDocument
- Comparison of e-book formats
- Comparison of data-serialization formats
