= John MacFarlane (philosopher) =

American philosopher

- Education: Harvard University; University of Pittsburgh
- Occupation: Professor
- Known for: Pandoc; CommonMark
- Scientific career
- Thesis: What Does it Mean to Say that Logic is Formal? (2000)
- Doctoral advisor: Robert Brandom
- Website: johnmacfarlane.net

John MacFarlane is an American professor of philosophy at the University of California, Berkeley interested in logic and metaphysics. He has made influential contributions to truth-value theory inferential semantics. In 2015, he was elected a Fellow of the American Academy of Arts and Sciences. He is also known for his contributions to open source software, especially the Pandoc document converter and other Markdown parsers and verifiers. MacFarlane was among the group of people that helped launch the CommonMark standardization effort for Markdown.

== Education ==
MacFarlane earned a bachelor's degree in philosophy from Harvard University and a PhD in philosophy at the University of Pittsburgh.

== Career and research ==
Most of McFarlane's work is in the philosophy of logic and language. Other research interests include metaphysics and epistemology, the philosophy of mathematics, philosophical logic, the history of logic, Frege, Kant and ancient philosophy particularly Aristotle.

=== Normativity of Logic ===
With respect to the normativity of logic for human thought, MacFarlane defends a certain claim made by Frege, a German mathematician and logician. In his book "The Foundational Laws of Arithmetic", which is a follow-up work to "The Foundations of Arithmetic" (1884), Frege claims to have overcome the limitations of Kant's logic, and MacFarlane acknowledges this. MacFarlane elaborates the idea in Frege, Kant, and the Logic in Logicism (2002): The comparability of Frege's and Kant's systems is disputed in scholarly discourse. MacFarlane argues that the systems are indeed comparable, because both thinkers Kant and Frege define logic fundamentally by its generality as a central characteristic. Accordingly, Frege's approach is suited to overcome Kant's.

In "In What Sense (If Any) Is Logic Normative for Thought?" (2004), MacFarlane turns to a problem raised by Gilbert Harman of the fundamental relationship between logic and human thought. He develops an approximative methodology that seeks to contain Harman's position: that there are no bridging principles. MacFarlane proposes an improved principle as a starting point for further conceptual research in the field.

Normativity of logic is a basic theme of MacFarlane's philosophy and was already on his mind while he was doing his Ph.D. at the University of Pittsburgh in 2000.

=== Linguistic Relativism ===
In his 2014 book titled "Assessment Sensitivity", MacFarlane elaborates a three-layered theory of linguistic relativity (Semantics proper, Semantics post, Pragmatics). The project seeks to unify the respective advantages of the three traditional semantic positions — Objectivism, Contextualism, and Expressivism — into one Assessment-Relativist position. Thus MacFarlane circumvents the respective disadvantages of the three existing positions. To this end, after rejecting the standard arguments against relativist positions, MacFarlane extends the established context sensitivity of the established non-relativist semantics to include judgment sensitivity in an analogous handling. In doing so, the thinker avoids the problems normally associated with semantic relativism. The technical underpinning that seeks to achieve judgment sensitivity of propositions using an index-based semantics is based on David Kaplan and David Lewis.

Assessment Sensitivity has been extensively reviewed in philosophical journals, and has been the subject of a book symposium with Diana Raffman, Jason Stanley, and Crispin Wright. Unusually, it has been made available as open access (as cited below).

=== Publications ===
His books and monographs include:

- MacFarlane, John (2014). Assessment sensitivity: relative truth and its applications (PDF). Oxford, United Kingdom: Clarendon Press.
- Macfarlane, John (14 April 2016). Assessment sensitivity: relative truth and its applications. Oxford, United Kingdom: Oxford University Press. ISBN 978-0-19-877681-9. Paperback edition.

His articles include

- Future contingents and relative truth
- Making sense of relative truth
- Nonindexical contextualism
