= Setext =

Lightweight markup language for text documents

- Filename extension: .etx (Note: ("enhanced/ e-mailable text"))
- Developed by: Ian Feldman
- Initial release: January 6, 1992; 34 years ago
- Type of format: Lightweight markup language

Setext (Structure Enhanced Text) is a lightweight markup language used to format plain text documents such as e-newsletters, Usenet postings, and e-mails. In contrast to some other markup languages (such as HTML), the markup is easily readable without any parsing or special software.

Setext was first introduced in 1992 by Ian Feldman for use in the TidBITS electronic newsletter.

== Purpose ==
Setext allows viewing of marked-up documents without special viewing software. When appropriate software is used, however, a rich text-style experience is available to the user.

Smaller documents are trivial to create in any text editor.

To prevent errors, most large setext publications are created using a markup language such as HTML or SGML and then converted. The setext document can then be distributed without the need for the recipient to use a HTML email or web viewer.

=== Multiple setext documents in the same file ===
Multiple setext documents can be stored in the same file, similarly to how the mbox format can store multiple e-mail messages together.

It was initially announced that multiple documents could be included in a single stream, separated by a special <end> tag serving as a document delimiter (Note: This was to function much in the same way as the original purpose of the ASCII "File Separator" (FS; 0x1C; typed as Ctrl-\) C0 control character but it proved too visually distracting and so was removed before setext was finalized.). After several months, it was clarified that this tag was not an official part of setext, and that multiple documents should instead be delimited by $$ appearing at the end of a line of text.

Regardless of the number of documents stored in the same file, basic metadata can be stored about any or all of them by using the subject-tt tag syntax.

== Setext tags ==
The following are the ten most common of the 16 different setext tags. (Note: (Not currently shown in table: note-tt, quote-tt, subject-tt, suppress-tt, twobuck-tt, and twodot-tt))

setext tag usage and examples (Note: (For a document to be valid setext, the only required tag is either 'subhead-tt' or 'title-tt' - all others are optional.)) (Note: "(A) formal definition of what makes a setext: a text that contains at least one verified setext subhead or setext title")
Name (Note: ('-tt' stands for 'typotag', the Feldman's shorthand for 'typographic tags'; contrast with the 'tags' used in modern systems for categorizing data or photos into groups))	setext pattern	Example (Note: (i.e. the actual text as stored / transmitted, except in the case of bullet-tt. Visual appearance would be defined/controlled by the program displaying the document.))	Comments
title-tt	Title =====	This is a long title ====================	A distinct title identified by the text, maximum one per setext. Must start at the beginning of the line.
subhead-tt	Subhead -------	Subheading One --------------	A distinct subheading identified by the text, zero or more per text. Must start at beginning of line. See note in title-tt about handling.
indent-tt	66-char lines indented by 2 spaces	First paragraph...   ...more of paragraph. [blank line]   Next paragraph...	Lines undented and unfolded (longer lines are generally tolerated by most parsers). This is primary body text, generally plain undented in emails, etc. currently.
bold-tt	**[multi ]word**	This is **very important**...	One or more bold words, generally *word* or **word** in emails
italic-tt	~word~	This is an ~italic~ word.	A single, italicized word; multi-word form was not officially specified due to "visual-clarity reasons" Multi-word form of ~first~second~third~ supported by setext2latex.
underline-tt	[_multi ]word_ [_multi]_word_	This is _underlined text_. This is _underlined_text_.	Display in a (user) selected style, preferably with underlining--except in browsers where underlining corresponds to hot links. One or more underlined words
hot-tt	[multi_]word_	This is a hot_word_.	Used to mark notes and URLs (Note: "synonymous with the 'grouped' style of HyperCard") (Note: A href-tt or note-tt 'hot word' prefixed with an underscore (i.e., _hot_word) defines a hyperlink or reference, whereas a hot-tt 'hot word' suffixed with an underscore (i.e., hot_word_) references that hyperlink/reference by name in the body of the text. (Before the Web was ubiquitous, what are now commonly known as 'hyperlinks' were then commonly called 'hot links', especially in 'CD-ROM era' software such as HyperCard and Macromedia Director and in games such as Myst.))
include-tt	>[space] [text]	> This is quoted text... > ...more...	Displayed in a user selected style, preferably monospaced with the leading ">"
bullet-tt	*[space] [text]	* Item 1 that is...    ...really long  * Item 2	Displayed in bullet or list format.
href-tt	.. _hot_word URL	.. _Wikipedia_home_page https://wikipedia.org	(Linked in the text with a hot-tt as Wikipedia_home_page_); These 'link definitions' are commonly placed at the end of a paragraph/section, or at the very end of the setext document.

== Standalone Setext files ==
By default all properly setext-ized files will have an ".etx" or ".ETX" suffix. This stands for an "emailable/enhanced text".

== See also ==
Other lightweight markup languages (inspired by Setext):

- Markdown, one of the most used.
- reStructuredText, used to generate Python manuals.
- Textile, designed to generate HTML.
- txt2tags
