= PmWiki =

Wiki software

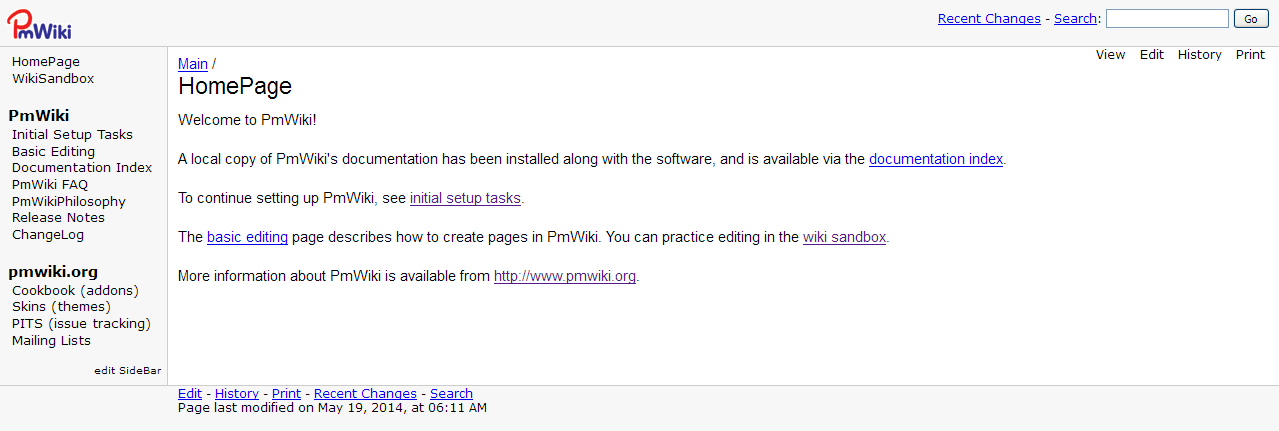
- Original author: Patrick R. Michaud
- Developer: PmWiki community
- Release: January 2002; 24 years ago
- Stable release: 2.7.8 / 2026-10-24[±]
- Preview release: SVN only / nightly
- Operating system: Cross-platform
- Platform: PHP
- Type: Wiki
- License: GNU General Public License
- Website: www.pmwiki.org
- Repository: pmwiki.org/pmwiki/tags/latest

PmWiki is a wiki-based content management system designed for a collaborative creation and maintenance of websites.

It is free software written in PHP, licensed under the terms of the GNU General Public License.

TV Tropes, a popular wiki focused on narrative devices, is based on a proprietary fork of PmWiki.

== Design focus ==
PmWiki is a wiki engine intended for collaborative web publishing. It includes features that support collaborative editing with built-in tools for access control, delegation, monitoring, review, and edit reversion. PmWiki's design allows configuration and extension, enabling updates to the core software while supporting local modifications.

In addition to standard collaborative features like content management and knowledge bases, PmWiki is utilized by companies and groups as an internal communication platform offering tools for task management and meeting archives. It is also employed by university and research teams.

PmWiki's markup syntax includes features such as pagelists, templates, page text variables, conditional directives, and syntax highlighting support, which may not be present in all other wiki engines. The PmWiki markup engine is customizable, and markup rules can be added, replaced or removed, and it can support other markup languages. As an example, the Creole specifications can be enabled. The edit form, since version 2.3.0, can have syntax highlighting enabled for its own wiki markup dialect.

== Features ==
=== Content storage ===
PmWiki uses regular text files to store content. Each page of the wiki is stored in its own file on the web server. By default pages are stored in 8-bit or UTF-8 encoding, with page text, metadata, and revision history in the same file. According to the author, "For the standard operations (view, edit, page revisions), holding the information in flat files is clearly faster than accessing them in a database..."

The storage class is extensible, allowing add-ons to enable other storage systems and formats. For example, with add-ons, a website can use SQLite or MySQL databases, or XML files for storage.

PmWiki supports "attachments" (uploads: images or other files) to its wiki pages. The attachments can be versioned. There are PmWiki add-ons allowing easier management of the uploaded files, e.g. deletion or thumbnail/gallery creation.

=== Wiki structure ===
Wiki pages are contained within namespaces, called "wiki groups". Multiple namespaces can be used, and each namespace can have its own configuration options, add-ons, access control, skin, styles, sidebar (menu), the language of the content, and interface.

Hierarchically, every page is contained in a namespace. It is possible to display and navigate through pages in a tree-like structure with a "wiki trail". Through recipes, it is possible to have a flat structure (no wiki groups), multiple nested groups, or sub-pages.

Special namespaces are "PmWiki", Site, SiteAdmin, and Category which contain the documentation and some configuration templates.

=== Markup ===
The PmWiki markup shares similarities with MediaWiki. Here is a sample of commonly used markup rules.

Links are usually wrapped in double brackets, optionally with link text:

[[Other page]], [[Page|link text]], [[Page|+]] (shows the page title), 
[[Page#anchor|Link text]], [[Link#~text to be highlighted|Link to text fragment]]
https://example.com/path/, mailto:mailbox@example.com (plain links)
[[https://example.com/path/|Link text]]
Wikipedia:Wiki_software (InterMap links)

It is possible to enable internal links for CamelCase words without brackets, and add-ons can enable other link markups like @Page.

Headings are preceded with exclamation marks:

! Top-level heading (<h1>)
!! Second-level heading
...
!!!!!! Sixth-level heading

It is possible to enable an automated table of contents coming with the PmWiki core, or install one among several Table of contents add-ons.

Lists are prefixed by "*" (bulleted), "#" (numbered), and ":" (description) and can be nested:

* List item
* List item
** Nested item

# Ordered list
# Another item
** Nested bulleted item

:Term: Description
:Another term: Its description
::Nested term: Description

Directives for listing pages and attachments, and including pages and templates:

(:pagelist group=Cookbook order=-time count=20:)

(:attachlist name=*.jpg:)

(:include AnotherPage#fromanchor#toanchor:)

(:include MyTemplate variable=value othervariable="Some value":)

Other page directives allow setting the page title, description, and keywords, disabling layout sections like sidebars or footers, creating tables, or defining page text variables. Add-ons allow for extra functionality.

Inline markup:

'''Bold''', ''italic'', @@code (fixed-width)@@, %classname%CSS styled text%%,
[-small text-], [+large text+], {+inserted+}, {-deleted-}, 
'^superscript^', '_subscript_',
%hlt php%[@
code block, possibly with syntax highlighting
@]

Semantic block tags:

>>classname id=identifier<<
Division block
>><<

(:div class=name id=identifier:)...(:divend:)
(:article ...:)...(:articleend:)
(:section ...:)...(:sectionend:)
(:header ...:)...(:headerend:)
(:footer ...:)...(:footerend:)
(:details summary="Toggle details":)...(:detailsend:)

(:div3 ...:)...(:div3end:) - Nested block, div, section, header, footer, article, aside, address, nav, details

Conditional markup:

(:if name *.HomePage:)
This is the homepage of a namespace
(:elseif auth edit:)
Current user can edit
(:else:)
...
(:ifend:)

Other markup rules can be enabled through recipes (add-ons).

HTML is not available for the edit form out of the box, but it is possible to enable selected tags through add-ons.

=== Skin templates ===
PmWiki includes a templating system for modifying interface layout and design.

Since version 2.3.30, the core responsive skin can have a dark theme enabled. The dark mode functions are available for reuse by custom skins.

=== Access control ===
PmWiki permits users and administrators to establish password protection for individual pages, groups of pages, or the entire site. For example, defined zones may be established to enable collaborative work by certain groups, such as in a company intranet.

Password protection can be applied to reading, editing, uploading to, and changing passwords for the restricted zone. The out-of-the-box installation uses "shared passwords" rather than login names, but a built-in option can enable a user/group-based access control system on pages, groups of pages or the whole wiki.

PmWiki can use passwords from config files, special wiki pages, and .htpasswd/.htgroup files. There are also user-based authorization possibilities and authentication via external sources (e.g. LDAP, forum databases, etc.).

=== Customization ===
PmWiki follows a design philosophy with the main objectives of ease of installation, maintainability, and keeping non-required features out of the core distribution of the software. PmWiki supports customization through user-created extensions called "recipes" available from the PmWiki Cookbook. A number of hooks in the wiki engine allow for creating extensions and custom installations.

== System requirements ==
Recent PmWiki releases require a web server that can run PHP version 5.4 or more recent. PmWiki can be installed on web servers or run locally using a provided script, for example from a USB flash drive.

== Books and articles about PmWiki ==
The following books analyse PmWiki, have dedicated chapters or sections, compare it with other wiki and CMS software:

- Todd Stauffer, How to Do Everything With Your Web 2.0 Blog, ISBN 978-0-07-149218-8
- White, Pauxtis, Web 2.0 for Business: Learning the New Tools, ISBN 978-0-470-43618-9
- Nancy Courtney, More Technology for the Rest of Us: A Second Primer on Computing for the Non-IT Librarian, ISBN 978-1-59158-939-6
- Karen A. Coombs, Amanda J. Hollister, Open Source Web Applications for Libraries, 2010, ISBN 978-1-57387-400-7
- Holtz, Demopoulos, Blogging for Business: Everything You Need to Know And Why You Should Care, ISBN 978-1-4195-3645-8
- Ebersbach, Glaser, Heigl, Wiki: Kooperation Im Web (German), ISBN 978-3-540-35110-8
- Lange, Christoph (ed.): Wikis und Blogs - Planen, Einrichten, Verwalten, C&L 2006 (German) ISBN 978-3-936546-44-6
- Frank Kleiner, A Semantic Wiki-based Platform for IT Service Management, Karlsruhe Institute of Technology (KIT) Scientific Publishing, 2015, ISBN 978-3-731-50333-0
- Pullman, Baotong, Designing Web-Based Applications for 21st Century Writing Classrooms, Taylor & Francis, Abingdon-on-Thames, 2016, ISBN 978-1-351-86810-5
- Tim Massaro, Toni Cairns (IBM), Collaborate Quickly with Wiki!, iSeries NEWS, 2005
- Brian May, Open Source Applications on IBM i, System iNEWS, 2009
- Lauren Barack, Never-Ending Story (Histoire sans fin), School Library Journal, 2007, about a collaborative effort of 8 authors writing a children's book on PmWiki
- Brenda Chawner, Paul Lewis, WikiWikiWebs: New Ways to Communicate in a Web Environment, Information Technology & Libraries, 2006.
- Matthew Bejune (Perdue U), Wikis in Libraries, Information Technology & Libraries, 2007

PmWiki has been featured in a number of printed and online magazines including Inc Magazine, Linux Gazette, PCMag, LXer, Framasoft, Linuxfr.

The page PmWiki References lists publications about PmWiki in various languages.

== See also ==
- Comparison of wiki software
- WikiWikiWeb
