= XHTML+MathML+SVG =

W3C standard

XHTML + MathML + SVG
- An XHTML + MathML + SVG Profile
- Status: Retired
- First published: 9 August 2002
- Organization: World Wide Web Consortium
- Editors: 石川 雅康 (Ishikawa Masayasu)
- Authors: HTML Working Group; SVG Working Group
- Base standards: XHTML 1.1; MathML 2.0; SVG 2.0
- Domain: Document Formats Domain
- Website: www.w3.org/TR/XHTMLplusMathMLplusSVG/

XHTML+MathML+SVG is a W3C standard that describes an integration of MathML and Scalable Vector Graphics semantics with XHTML and Cascading Style Sheets. It is categorized as "obsolete" on the W3C's HTML Current Status page.
