= MultiMarkdown =

Lightweight markup language

- Filename extensions: .mmd
- Developed by: Fletcher T. Penney
- Initial release: May 2007 (19 years ago)
- Latest release: 6 (9 years ago)
- Type of format: Open file format
- Extended from: Markdown
- Website: fletcherpenney.net/multimarkdown/

MultiMarkdown is a lightweight markup language created by Fletcher T. Penney as an extension of the Markdown format. It supports additional features not available in plain Markdown syntax.

There is also a text editor with the same name that supports multiple export formats.

== File format description ==
The MultiMarkdown language adds the following features to the basic Markdown specification:

- footnotes
- tables
- citations and bibliography (works best in LaTeX using BibTeX)
- math support
- automatic cross-referencing ability
- smart typography, with support for multiple languages
- image attributes
- table and image captions
- definition lists
- glossary entries (LaTeX only)
- document metadata (e.g. title, author, date, etc.)

== Software ==
There are a series of open-source interactive and automated software tools for editing and conversion to XML, HTML, and LaTeX that share the same name as the format. Several other open-source and commercial text editors, such as Scrivener, also include broad MultiMarkdown support.

== See also ==
- Setext
- Markdown
- XML
