= MagicPoint =

- Developer(s): WIDE Project
- Stable release: 1.13a / February 13, 2008; 17 years ago
- Operating system: Any Unix-like
- Type: Presentation program
- License: BSD license
- Website: http://member.wide.ad.jp/wg/mgp/

MagicPoint is one of several open-source presentation programs, often used to produce slides for conferences. Unlike most presentation programs, such as Microsoft PowerPoint, where a GUI is used to create slides, MagicPoint slides are created by writing text files using a simple markup language. The resulting file is then displayed with MagicPoint's X11-based viewer.

== History ==
MagicPoint was originally created in the autumn of 1997, at a WIDE Project camp. It was originally known as tp, standing for TinyPoint, but in December the name was changed to MagicPoint.

== Features ==
- Content is written in text files and formatting is indicated by text features. For example, different level bullet points can be created by simply indenting the text with tabs
- Many image formats are supported
- Slides can be scaled to different screen sizes
- External applications can be executed from inside the presentation
- A talk timer and slide guide are included
- Presentations can be exported to HTML or PostScript files.

Another feature of MagicPoint is the ability to draw on slides during a presentation. By pressing x on the keyboard, the slide can temporarily be scribbled on with red "ink". Shift x allows you to cycle through other pen colours.
