= TV Tropes =

Wiki documenting plot conventions in creative works

- Screenshot as of July 16, 2020
- Website type: Wiki
- Available in: 13 languages
- Owners: Chris Richmond; Drew Schoentrup
- Website: tvtropes.org
- Commercial: Ad-supported
- Registration: Required for all features other than viewing
- Users: 17,000+
- Launched: April 2004; 22 years ago
- Current status: Active
- Content license: CC-BY-SA before July 2012; CC BY-NC-SA from July 2012
- Written in: PmWiki (very heavily modified with no current source code used)

TV Tropes (also written as TVTropes) is a wiki founded in 2004 that collects and documents descriptions and examples of genre tropes: recurring narrative and plot devices in various storytelling media. Its contents cover many creative works and non-media subjects, which are written and maintained by a community of volunteers, known as "Tropers". The nature of the site as a provider of commentary on pop culture and fiction has attracted attention and criticism from several web personalities and blogs.

== Website content ==
Established in 2004, TV Tropes initially focused on various tropes in television, but has since shifted to those in general media, toys, writings, and their associated fandoms. It also covers non-media subjects such as history, geography, and politics. Contents of TV Tropes are written and maintained by a community of volunteers, known as "Tropers". According to the site's Google Analytics in August 2020, tropers primarily consist of 18-34 year olds.

From April 2008 until July 2012, TV Tropes published free content. After that, the site modified its license to allow only non-commercial distribution of its content but continued to host the prior submissions under a new distribution license.

TV Tropes runs on its own wiki engine software, an extremely modified version of PmWiki to the point where the PmWiki website lists that it "no longer uses PmWiki in any way; the only trace that remains is in the URL" and that "no code is in use" but is not open source. Before October 2010, it was possible to edit anonymously; however, registration is now mandatory for all other activities besides viewing the website.

TV Tropes has two subwikis meant to categorize the more informal tropes and is held to less rigorous standards. Darth Wiki, named after Darth Vader from Star Wars as a play on "the dark side" of TV Tropes, is a resource for more criticism-based trope examples or common ways the wiki is inappropriately edited. Sugar Wiki, on the other hand, is about praise-based tropes, such as funny or heartwarming moments in works, and is meant to be "the sweet side" of TV Tropes.

== History ==
Old TV Tropes logo

TV Tropes was founded in 2004 by a programmer under the pseudonym "Fast Eddie." He described himself as having become interested in the conventions of genre fiction while studying at MIT in the 1970s and after browsing Internet forums in the 1990s. He sold the site in 2014 to Drew Schoentrup and Chris Richmond, who then launched a Kickstarter to overhaul the codebase and design.

Initially focused on the TV series Buffy the Vampire Slayer, TV Tropes has since expanded its coverage of many forms of media, including fan fiction, and many other subjects, including Internet works such as Wikipedia (often referred to in a tongue-in-cheek way as "The Other Wiki"). Articles on the site often relate to real life or point out real situations where certain tropes are applied. It has used its informal style to describe topics such as science, philosophy, politics, and history under its Useful Notes section. TV Tropes does not have notability standards for the works it covers.

On March 19, 2025, TV Tropes launched its own mobile app.

=== Financial censorship ===
In October 2010, in what TV Tropes refers to as "The Google Incident", Google temporarily withdrew its AdSense service from the site after determining that pages regarding adult and mature tropes were inconsistent with its terms of service. The site separated NSFG articles (Not Safe for Google) from SFG articles (Safe for Google) in order to allow discussion of these kinds of tropes.

In a separate incident in 2012 (referred to as "The Second Google Incident"), in response to other complaints by Google, TV Tropes changed its guidelines to restrict coverage of sexist tropes and rape tropes. Feminist blog The Mary Sue criticized this decision, as it censored documentation of sexist tropes in video games and young adult fiction. ThinkProgress additionally condemned Google AdSense itself for "providing a financial disincentive to discuss" such topics. TV Tropes has then created "The Content Policy" to restrict works and tropes that are explicit sex contents or depictions of sexual activity between children. Several tropes and works were removed per the content policy. Some forks were created after the change, notably All The Tropes and Tropedia.

== Reception ==
In an interview with TV Tropes co-founder Fast Eddie, Gawker Media's blog io9 described the tone of contributions to the site as "often light and funny". Cyberpunk author Bruce Sterling once described its style as a "wry fanfic analysis". Essayist Linda Börzsei described TV Tropes as a technological continuum of classical archetypal literary criticisms, capable of deconstructing recurring elements from creative works in an ironic fashion. Economist Robin Hanson, inspired by a scholarly analysis of Victorian literature, suggests TV Tropes offers a veritable treasure trove of information about fiction – a prime opportunity for research into its nature.

In Lifehacker, Nick Douglas compared TV Tropes to Wikipedia, recommending to "use [TV Tropes] when Wikipedia feels impenetrable, when you want opinions more than facts, or when you've finished a Wikipedia page and now you want the juicy parts, the hard-to-confirm bits that Wikipedia doesn't share." Writing for The Believer, Chantel Tattolli commented that "It is deeply satisfying to go there and reckon with the patterns made over time, across culture, medium, and genre—and to catch them in rotation."

In the book Media After Deleuze, authors David Savat and Tauel Harper say that while TV Tropes does offer a "wonderful archeology of storytelling", the site undermines creativity and experience by attempting to "classify and represent" every part of a work. The site is described in Reference Reviews as "an excellent example of linked data", but pointedly "lacks accountability as a reliable resource" due to its standards on notability.

== See also ==
- Archetype
- Meme
- Monomyth
- Motif-Index of Folk-Literature

=== Relevant fields of critique ===
- Film criticism
- Game studies
- Literary criticism
- Television criticism
