= DokuWiki =

Wiki software

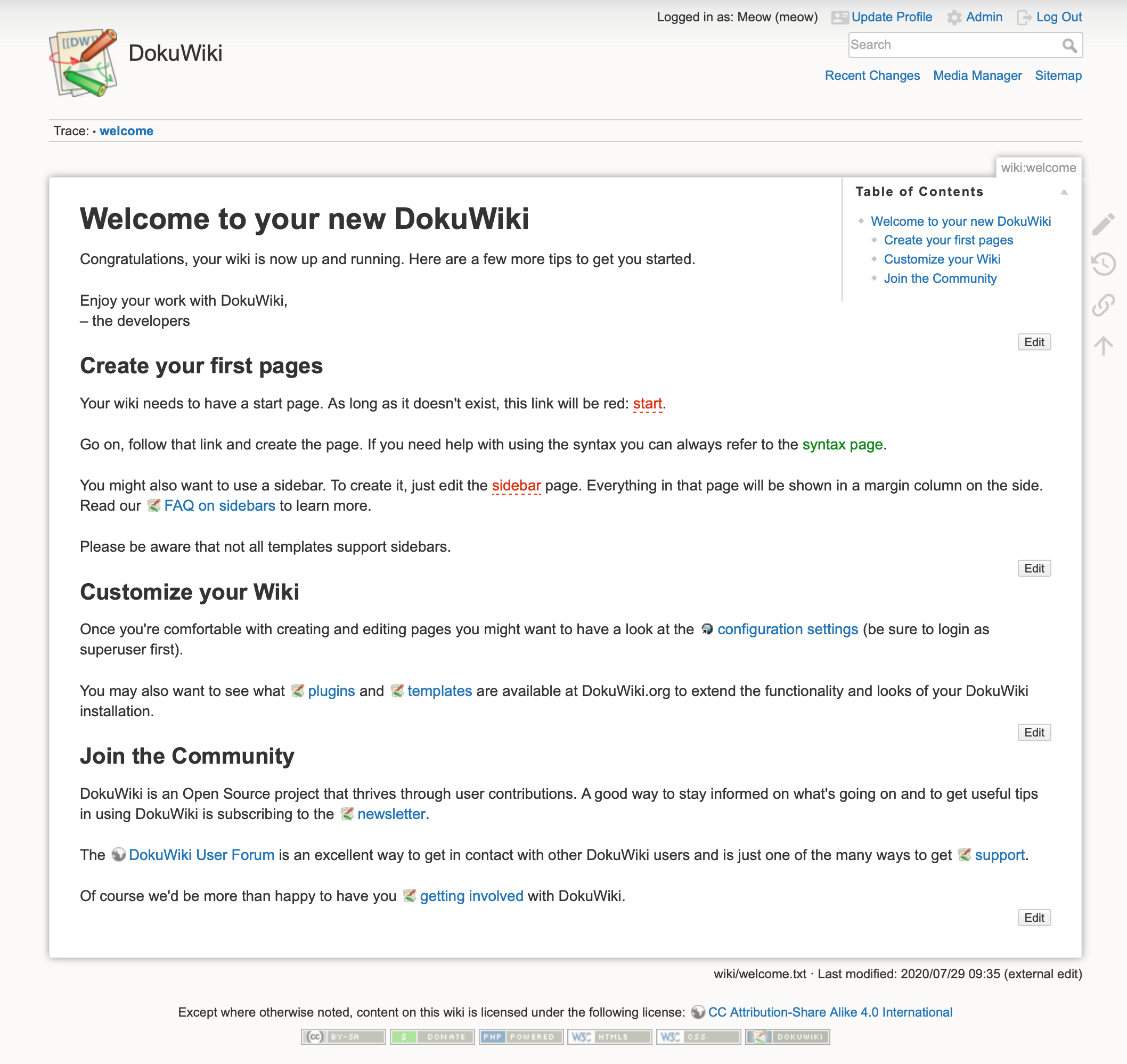
- Screenshot The home page of a default DokuWiki installation
- Developers: Andreas Gohr, et al.
- Release: July 4, 2004; 22 years ago
- Stable release: 2026-07-14c / 2 September 2026; 2 months ago
- Written in: PHP
- Operating system: Cross-platform
- Size: ≈2.5 MB (compressed)
- Available in: 74 languages
- Type: Wiki software
- License: GPLv2
- Website: www.dokuwiki.org
- Repository: github.com/dokuwiki/dokuwiki

DokuWiki is an open source wiki application, licensed under GPLv2 and written in the PHP programming language. It works on plain text files and thus does not need a database. It has a syntax similar to the one used by MediaWiki, and is often recommended as a more lightweight, easier to customize alternative. The 'Doku' in DokuWiki is short for Dokumentation (documentation in German). It can be installed on local PCs, flash drives, and folders synced with file hosting services or file synchronization programs such as Dropbox or Syncthing.

== History ==
DokuWiki was created by Andreas Gohr in June 2004. In July, the first official release was published on Freshmeat (now known as Freecode).

Originally, DokuWiki used a simple list of regular expressions to transform wiki syntax into HTML. A big step forward in the development was the re-design of the parser and the renderer mechanisms based on contributions by Harry Fuecks in January 2005. The new design made use of the then-new object-oriented features of PHP4. The new parser and the introduction of a cache mechanism led to significant performance improvements, thus making DokuWiki usable for larger projects.

The new parser also prepared DokuWiki for the introduction of a generic plugin interface which simplified the development and maintenance of syntax-based plugins. Over the years, additional plugin mechanisms followed which allowed third-party developers to extend nearly all aspects of the wiki software.

The introduction of DokuWiki into the Debian and Gentoo Linux distributions in April and July 2005, respectively, significantly increased the visibility of the software.

The DokuWiki logo is the result of a design contest. The winning logo, designed by Esther Brunner, represents editing pages (by pencils of different colors, i.e. different people) and linking them.

For many years, DokuWiki's source code was managed through the Darcs distributed version control system. In 2010 a switch to Git was made, making use of GitHub for hosting.

Today, DokuWiki is one of the most widely used wiki engines available and has achieved significant usage with stable interest over time.

=== Release history ===
Version	Codename	Significant changes
2004-07-04	none	Initial DokuWiki release.
...
2009-02-14b	none	
2009-12-25c	Lemming	
2010-11-07a	Anteater	
2011-05-25c	Rincewind	IPv6 support and metadata index.
2012-01-25c	Angua	New media manager (result of the Google Summer of Code-project). Version handling of media files. drag & drop support in media manager to speed up adding new files (only works in Firefox and Chrome).
2012-10-13	Adora Belle	New default DokuWiki template with optional sidebar.
2013-05-10a	Weatherwax	
2013-12-08	Binky	
2014-05-05e	Ponder Stibbons	
2014-09-29d	Hrun	Single strings of the localization customizable. New history function to see how a wiki looked at a certain time. Security fix for AD/LDAP auth plugin.
2015-08-10a	Detritus	New Style Manager to adjust template variables such as colors. The Extension Manager can now remove old files when updating extensions.
2016-06-26a	Elenor of Tsort	New authPDO plugin; authmysql and authpgsql are deprecated. Internet Explorer 8 (and older) no longer supported; workarounds removed. Support for PHP's builtin web server.
2017-02-19c	Frusterick Manners	New Admin screen. jQuery 3, PHP 7.1 support and PHP 7.0 bug fixes.
2018-04-22	Greebo	New form on search page with more search tools. New command line plugins. New menu system. PHP 7.2 support and improvements for PHP 7.3 support.
2020-07-29	Hogfather	PHP 7.4 compatibility and some preparations for the upcoming PHP8.
2022-07-31	Igor	Drop support for PHP versions earlier than 7.2. Support for SVG images. New form events.
2023-04-04	Jack Jackrum	Better PHP8 support. Support for embedding PHP and HTML codes is dropped.
2024-02-06	Kaos	Drop support for PHP versions earlier than 7.4. Complete Overhaul of the Remote API and introduction of the JSONRPC transport. Token Auth support.
2025-05-14	Librarian	New mechanism to trust proxies; a bunch of methods and classes that had been marked as deprecated in previous versions have been removed.
2026-07-14	Mort	New and optional support to Markdown syntax, dropped support for PHP versions below 8.2. Refactoring of internal fulltext search engine. And more edits.

Since 2011, releases are named after Discworld characters.

== Main features ==
Installation and Requirements
DokuWiki requires only a webserver and PHP; no database is needed. It can run on cheap web hosting servers and is usually installed by simply unpacking. Additional plugins may have additional requirements.
Revision control
DokuWiki stores all versions of each wiki page, allowing the user to compare the current version with any older version. The difference engine is the same as the one used in MediaWiki. Parallel editing of one page by multiple users is prevented by a locking mechanism.
Access control
Access control can be handled by a user manager, which allows users and groups of users to be defined, and an access control list in which an administrator user can define permissions on page and namespace level, giving DokuWiki more fine-grained control than Mediawiki. Besides the built-in user management, DokuWiki also provides mechanisms for authentication against databases, LDAP Servers and Active Directory. Other authentication mechanisms are available as plugins.
Plugins
DokuWiki has a generic plugin interface which simplifies the process of writing and maintaining plugins. There are ≈1000 plugins available. These can be easily integrated and managed by an administrator user with the help of the plugin manager.
Templates
The appearance of the wiki can be defined by a template. There are various templates provided by the development community.
Internationalization and localization
DokuWiki supports Unicode (UTF-8) and properly handles right-to-left languages, so languages such as Chinese, Thai, and Hebrew can be displayed. DokuWiki can be configured in about 70 languages. Multilingual wikis can be configured through plugins. Users can contribute translations of the DokuWiki software and of plugins through a web interface.
Caching
DokuWiki uses a two-level cache mechanism which stores the parsed wiki page in an intermediate serialized format which is then rendered to the desired output format, such as HTML5. This rendered format is cached again. The two levels of caching expire on different conditions. The caching helps to reduce server load and speeds up access to the information.
Full text search
DokuWiki has an integrated indexed search with which a user can search for keywords and phrases on the wiki.
Wiki markup
DokuWiki uses a simple markup language similar to that of MediaWiki. Like MediaWiki, it makes use of free links, but CamelCase links can optionally be enabled. WYSIWYG editors are available as plugins.

== DokuWiki based software projects ==
Some independent software projects based on DokuWiki have been created. These projects usually bundle the DokuWiki software, select plugins, a customized design and sometimes pre-built content for specialized use cases.

- The EinsatzleiterWiki is a German project, bundling fire fighting knowledge in a package that can be installed in fire departments and then be customized to the needs of the specific department. The wiki is used by the professional fire services of Berlin, Kaiserslautern, Wuppertal and many voluntary fire services in Germany.
- open|SchulPortfolio is a German project aimed at the internal management of schools. It has been created with input from the ministry of education of the German state of Baden-Württemberg.
- ICKEWiki is a redistribution of DokuWiki with a focus on the use in enterprises. It was originally developed in a research project focusing on adding structured data to wikis and making it more usable in industrial production companies.

As required by DokuWiki's license these projects are all licensed under the GPL version 2.

== See also ==
- List of wiki software
- Comparison of wiki software
