= Creole (markup) =

Lightweight markup language for wikis

Creole is a lightweight markup language, aimed at being a common markup language for wikis, enabling and simplifying the transfer of content between different wiki engines.

== History ==
The idea was conceived during a workshop at the 2006 International Symposium on Wikis. An EBNF grammar and XML interchange format for Creole have also been published. Creole was designed by comparing major wiki engines and using the most common markup for a particular wikitext element. If no commonality was found, the wikitext of the dominant wiki engine MediaWiki was usually chosen.

On July 4, 2007, the version 1.0 (final) of Creole was released, and a two-year development freeze was implemented to allow time for authors of wiki engines to adopt the new markup.

== Creole syntax examples ==
Emphasized text:

//emphasized// (e.g., italics)
 
**strongly emphasized** (e.g., bold)

Lists:

* Bullet list
* Second item
** Sub item

# Numbered list
# Second item
## Sub item

Links:

Link to [[wikipage]]
[[link_address|link text]]

Headings (closing equals signs are optional):

= Extra-large heading
== Large heading
=== Medium heading
==== Small heading

Linebreaks:

Force\\linebreak

Horizontal line:

----

Images:

{{Image.jpg|title}}

Tables:

|=  |= table |= header |
| a | table  | row     |
| b | table  | row     |

No markup:

{{{
This text will //not// be **formatted**.
}}}

== Support in engines ==
Creole 1.0 is the default syntax in Bitbucket wikis, which also support some Creole 1.0 additions.

Creole 1.0 is one of the available markup languages for the online educational platform Moodle and the UML rendering software PlantUML.
