= Markdown =

Plain text markup language

- Filename extensions: .md, .markdown
- Internet media type: text/markdown
- Uniform Type Identifier (UTI): net.daringfireball.markdown
- UTI conformation: public.utf8-plain-text
- Magic number: None
- Developed by: John Gruber
- Initial release: March 9, 2004 (22 years ago)
- Latest release: 1.0.1; December 17, 2004 (21 years ago)
- Type of format: Open file format
- Extended to: pandoc, MultiMarkdown, Markdown Extra, CommonMark, RMarkdown
- Website: daringfireball.net/projects/markdown/

Markdown is a lightweight markup language for creating formatted text using a plain-text editor. John Gruber created Markdown in 2004 as an easy-to-read markup language. Markdown is widely used for blogging, instant messaging, and large language models, and also used elsewhere in online forums, collaborative software, note-taking software, documentation pages, and README files.

The initial description of Markdown contained ambiguities and raised unanswered questions, causing implementations to both intentionally and accidentally diverge from the original version. This was addressed in 2014 when long-standing Markdown contributors released CommonMark, an unambiguous specification and test suite for Markdown.

== History ==
Markdown was inspired by pre-existing conventions for marking up plain text in email and usenet posts, such as the earlier markup languages setext (c. 1992), Textile (c. 2002), and reStructuredText (c. 2002).

In 2002, Aaron Swartz created atx and referred to it as "the true structured text format". Gruber created the Markdown language in 2004 with Swartz as his "sounding board". The goal of the language was to enable people "to write using an easy-to-read and easy-to-write plain text format, optionally convert it to structurally valid XHTML (or HTML)".

Another key design goal was readability, that the language be readable as-is, without looking like it has been marked up with tags or formatting instructions, unlike text formatted with "heavier" markup languages, such as Rich Text Format (RTF), HTML, or even wikitext, each of which have obvious in-line tags and formatting instructions which can make the text more difficult for humans to read.

Gruber wrote a Perl script, Markdown.pl, which converts marked-up text input to valid, well-formed XHTML or HTML, encoding angle brackets (<, >) and ampersands (&), which would be misinterpreted as special characters in those languages. It can take the role of a standalone script, a plugin for Blosxom or Movable Type, or of a text filter for BBEdit.

== Rise and divergence ==
As Markdown's popularity grew rapidly, many Markdown implementations appeared, driven mostly by the need for additional features such as tables, footnotes, definition lists, (Note: Technically HTML description lists) and Markdown inside HTML blocks.

The behavior of some of these diverged from the reference implementation, as Markdown was only characterised by an informal specification and a Perl implementation for conversion to HTML.

At the same time, a number of ambiguities in the informal specification had attracted attention. These issues spurred the creation of tools such as Babelmark to compare the output of various implementations, and an effort by some developers of Markdown parsers for standardization. However, Gruber has argued that complete standardization would be a mistake: "Different sites (and people) have different needs. No one syntax would make all happy."

Gruber avoided using curly braces in Markdown to unofficially reserve them for implementation-specific extensions.

== CommonMark ==
CommonMark
- Filename extensions: .md, .markdown
- Internet media type: text/markdown; variant=CommonMark
- Uniform Type Identifier (UTI): uncertain
- UTI conformation: public.plain-text
- Developed by: John MacFarlane, open source
- Initial release: October 25, 2014 (12 years ago)
- Latest release: 0.31.2; January 28, 2024 (2 years ago)
- Type of format: Open file format
- Extended from: Markdown
- Extended to: GitHub Flavored Markdown
- Website: commonmark.org spec.commonmark.org

=== Standardization ===
In 2012, a group of people, including Jeff Atwood and John MacFarlane, launched what Atwood characterised as a standardization effort.

A community website now aims to "document various tools and resources available to document authors and developers, as well as implementors of the various Markdown implementations".

=== Name ===
In September 2014, Gruber objected to the usage of "Markdown" in the name of this effort and it was rebranded as "CommonMark". CommonMark.org published several versions of a specification, reference implementation, test suite, and "[plans] to announce a finalized 1.0 spec and test suite in 2019". A finalized 1.0 spec has not been released, as major issues still remain unsolved.

=== Adoption ===
Nonetheless, several websites and projects have adopted CommonMark, including Codeberg, Discourse, GitHub, GitLab, Reddit, Qt, Stack Exchange (Stack Overflow), and Swift.

In March 2016, two relevant informational Internet RFCs were published:

- RFC 7763 – "The text/markdown Media Type," Informational.
  Introduces MIME type text/markdown.
- RFC 7764 – "Guidance on Markdown: Design Philosophies, Stability Strategies, and Select Registrations," Informational.
  Discusses and registers the variants MultiMarkdown, GitHub Flavored Markdown (GFM), Pandoc, and Markdown Extra (among others).

It is also used for the output of generative artificial intelligences, like Gemini, in Internet browsers.

== Variants ==
Websites including Bitbucket, Diaspora, Discord, GitHub, OpenStreetMap, Reddit, SourceForge and Stack Exchange use variants of Markdown to make discussions between users easier.

Depending on implementation, basic inline HTML tags may be supported.

Italic text may be implemented by _underscores_ or *single-asterisks*.

Many platforms implement spoiler formatting that hides text until hovered, clicked or tapped. The most common markup is ||spoiler|| used by Discord, Telegram, various Matrix clients, now defunct Guilded, a forum called Flarum, a NodeBB plugin, the imageboard engine JSChan and possibly more.

=== GitHub Flavored Markdown ===
GitHub had been using its own variant of Markdown since as early as 2009, which added support for additional formatting such as tables and nesting block content inside list elements, as well as GitHub-specific features such as auto-linking references to commits, issues, usernames, etc.

In 2017, GitHub released a formal specification of its GitHub Flavored Markdown (GFM) that is based on CommonMark. It is a strict superset of CommonMark, following its specification exactly except for tables, strikethrough, autolinks and task lists, which GFM adds as extensions.

Accordingly, GitHub also changed the parser used on their sites, which required that some documents be changed. For instance, GFM now requires that the hash symbol that creates a heading be separated from the heading text by a space character.

=== Markdown Extra ===
Markdown Extra is a lightweight markup language based on Markdown implemented in PHP (originally), Python and Ruby. It adds the following features that are not available with regular Markdown:

- Markdown markup inside HTML blocks
- Elements with id/class attribute
- "Fenced code blocks" that span multiple lines of code
- Tables
- Definition lists
- Footnotes
- Abbreviations

Markdown Extra is supported in some content management systems such as Drupal, Grav (CMS), Textpattern CMS and TYPO3.

== Examples ==
Text using Markdown syntax	Corresponding HTML produced by a Markdown processor	Text viewed in a browser
Heading ======= Sub-heading ----------- # Alternative heading ## Alternative sub-heading Paragraphs are separated  by a blank line. Two spaces at the end of a line   produce a line break.	<h1>Heading</h1> <h2>Sub-heading</h2> <h1>Alternative heading</h1> <h2>Alternative sub-heading</h2> <p>Paragraphs are separated by a blank line.</p> <p>Two spaces at the end of a line<br /> produce a line break.</p>	Heading Sub-heading Alternative heading Alternative sub-heading Paragraphs are separated by a blank line. Two spaces at the end of a line produce a line break.
Text attributes *italic*, **bold**, `monospace`. Horizontal rule: ---	<p>Text attributes <em>italic</em>, <strong>bold</strong>, <code>monospace</code>.</p> <p>Horizontal rule:</p> <hr />	Text attributes italic, bold, monospace. Horizontal rule:
Bullet lists nested within numbered list:   1. fruits      * apple      * banana   2. vegetables      - carrot      - broccoli	<p>Bullet lists nested within numbered list:</p> <ol>   <li>fruits <ul>       <li>apple</li>       <li>banana</li>   </ul></li>   <li>vegetables <ul>       <li>carrot</li>       <li>broccoli</li>   </ul></li> </ol>	Bullet lists nested within numbered list: 1. fruits; apple; banana 2. vegetables; carrot; broccoli
A [link](http://example.com). ![Image](Icon-pictures.png "icon") > Markdown uses email-style characters for blockquoting. > > Multiple paragraphs need to be prepended individually. Most inline <abbr title="Hypertext Markup Language">HTML</abbr> tags are supported.	<p>A <a href="http://example.com">link</a>.</p> <p><img alt="Image" title="icon" src="Icon-pictures.png" /></p> <blockquote> <p>Markdown uses email-style characters for blockquoting.</p> <p>Multiple paragraphs need to be prepended individually.</p> </blockquote> <p>Most inline <abbr title="Hypertext Markup Language">HTML</abbr> tags are supported.</p>	A link. Markdown uses email-style characters for blockquoting. Multiple paragraphs need to be prepended individually. Most inline HTML tags are supported.

== Implementations ==
Implementations of Markdown are available for over a dozen programming languages; in addition, many applications, platforms and frameworks support Markdown. For example, Markdown plugins exist for every major blogging platform.

While Markdown is a minimal markup language and is read and edited with a normal text editor, there are specially designed editors that preview the files with styles, which are available for all major platforms. Many general-purpose text and code editors have syntax highlighting plugins for Markdown built into them or available as optional download.

Editors may feature a side-by-side preview window or render the code directly in a WYSIWYG fashion. Some Markdown editors display an inline preview as users edit Markdown source. Popular examples include Typora, Obsidian, and Marble.

== See also ==
- Comparison of document markup languages
- Comparison of documentation generators
- Comparison of wiki software
- Lightweight markup language
- List of markup languages
- List of text editors
- Wiki markup
