= Pdoc =

API documentation generator

pdoc
- Original author(s): Andrew Gallant
- Developer(s): Mitmproxy Project
- Initial release: August 9, 2013; 11 years ago
- Stable release: 15.0.3 / 21 April 2025; 19 days ago
- Repository: github.com/mitmproxy/pdoc
- Written in: Python
- Operating system: Cross-platform
- Type: Documentation generator
- License: Public Domain (UNLICENSE)
- Website: pdoc.dev

Pdoc is a software package for generating API documentation for Python programming language. Built as a successor to Epydoc, Pdoc uses introspection to extract documentation from source code docstrings and allows programmers to generate HTML documentation for chosen Python modules. It is thus functionally similar to Pydoc, Perldoc and Javadoc. It supports identifier cross-linking and Markdown for its doc string format.

== Forks ==
A lack of original project activity in 2018-2019 spurred several forks, such as pdoc3 and pdocs, part of the portray suite.

As of 2021, the original pdoc project is active again.

== See also ==
- Comparison of documentation generators
