= YARD (software) =

- Original author: Loren Segal
- Release: February 24, 2007; 19 years ago
- Stable release: 0.9.5 / June 22, 2016; 10 years ago
- Written in: Ruby
- Operating system: Cross-platform
- Type: Embedded documentation generator
- License: MIT license
- Website: yardoc.org
- Repository: github.com/lsegal/yard

YARD (Yay! A Ruby Documentation Tool) is an embedded documentation generator for the Ruby programming language. It analyzes the Ruby source code, generating a structured collection of pages for Ruby objects and methods. Code comments can be added in a natural style.

YARD is useful even if the target source code does not contain explicit comments. YARD will still parse the classes, modules, and methods, and list them in the generated API files.

YARD extends upon the capabilities of RDoc in a number of dimensions:

- extensibility
- modularity
- parsing

Dan Kubb has created an ancillary tool, named Yardstick, which verifies YARD (or RDoc) documentation coverage.

== See also ==
- Comparison of documentation generators
- RDoc
- Ruby Document format
