= MkDocs =

Documentation generator

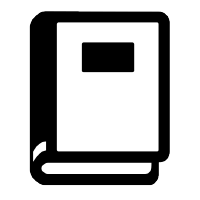
- Developers: Tom Christie, Dougal Matthews, Waylan Limberg, Oleh Prypin, Ultrabug
- Release: January 24, 2014
- Stable release: 1.6.1 / August 30, 2024; 2 years ago
- Written in: Python
- Operating system: Cross-platform
- Type: Documentation generator
- License: BSD
- Website: www.mkdocs.org
- Repository: github.com/mkdocs/mkdocs

MkDocs is static site generator designed for building project documentation. It is written in Python, and also used in other environments.

== Mode of operation ==
MkDocs converts Markdown files into HTML pages, effectively creating a static website containing documentation.

Markdown is extensible, and the MkDocs ecosystem exploits its extensible nature through a number of extensions. These help with autogenerating documentation from source code, adding admonitions, writing mathematical notation, inserting footnotes, highlighting source code, etc.

== Themes ==
MkDocs provides two built-in themes, default theme (based on Bootstrap) and Read the Docs theme. Many of the available third-party themes are listed in the official catalog, including the popular Material for MkDocs theme.

== History ==
The first tagged version of MkDocs, version 0.2, came out on January 21, 2014.

By early 2015, Read the Docs supported building documentation with MkDocs, in addition to Sphinx. In preparation for the 0.12 release, MkDocs started using Read the Docs for hosting.

In January 2016, MkDocs added support for installable themes. Next month, Martin Donath started developing Material for MkDocs theme. In the following years, the theme became very popular and in July 2020 the development model was changed to sponsorware, where the new features get released to the Insiders version first and become publicly available after funding goals are hit.

Martin Donath's theme became its own project (Material for MkDocs ) and was active for almost 10 years, After not being active for some time, Donath announced that he is abandoning the use of MkDocs due to inherent limitations, and wrote a new static engine from scratch in a new project called Zensical.

In March 2026, after some changes in the list of maintainers, MkDocs's original creator (Mia Kimberly Christie - @lovelydinosaur) took control of the repository again and announced that version v2.0 of MkDocs is in the works.

== Usage ==
MkDocs offers built-in support for deployment to GitHub Pages. Alternatives, such as GitLab and Cloudflare Pages, offer first-party support for deploying MkDocs sites.

Many companies use MkDocs with the Material theme to deploy their documentation, including Atlassian, Google, Microsoft, and Red Hat. It is also a popular choice among open source projects, such as Electron, Kubernetes, and WebKit.

== See also ==
- Comparison of documentation generators
- JAMstack
