= Mkd (software) =

Software to generate software documentation

V model from structured systems design

mkd is a software application for extracting pre-encoded comments lines to generate software documentation according to the ISO/IEC standard. mkd is an abbreviation of make documentation. mkd was originally known as mkdoc.

== Availability ==
mkd is compilable 'as is' for all UNIX or Linux systems (format of characters UTF-8) and has been used extensively with Red Hat on Personal computers, on SUN SPARC and HP-UX, up of the year 2000 in the ASCII format; The location of the directories was different from the current location (man, whatis, ...).

The Fedora and Red Hat RPM packages are distributed since 2015 by the maintainers of mkd.

For Debian as well as Ubuntu systems, mkd is provided and distributed as Ubuntu packages of launchpad

mkd is, in principle, compatible with all Unix and Linux systems, except, sometimes, the location of the manuals and documentations directories.

mkd is also available for Microsoft Windows.

== Bibliography ==
- Reference manual man mkd
- First ISO Catalogue
- Comment (computer programming)
- Comparison of documentation generators
- (in French) https://fr.wikibooks.org/wiki/Mkd_(Extracteur_de_documents)
- (in French) Construction d'un paquet RPM avec l'archive source de mkd

== Sources ==
Downloads mkd Debian-Ubuntu on launchpad

- Packages : all, amd64 and i386
- Sources : mkd_140315.tar.gz

Downloads all archives on the maintainers site;

- https://eell.fr

RPM sources and packages (Fedora, Red Hat, and so on).
Sources and distributions for Windows systems and its derivatives (Cygwin, Mingw).
