= NDOC (disambiguation) =

The Nevada Department of Corrections is a governmental agency in the U.S. state of Nevada.

NDOC (and variants) may also refer to:

- Kenya National Disaster Operation Centre
- NDoc, code documentation generator for the .NET Common Language Infrastructure
- Ndoc, Albanian given name
