= NDoc =

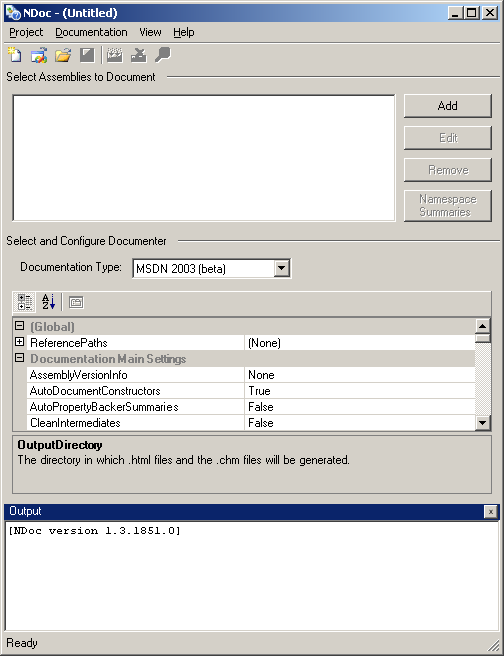
- NDoc 1.3.1 displaying empty project
- Developer(s): Diamond, Manoli, et al.
- Stable release: 1.3.1 / 25 January 2005
- Operating system: Cross-platform (?)
- Type: Documentation generator
- License: GNU GPL
- Website: ndoc.sourceforge.net

NDoc is a code documentation generator for the Common Language Infrastructure created by Jason Diamond, Jean-Claude Manoli and Kral Ferch. It is licensed under the GNU General Public License.

== How it works ==
NDoc uses two sources to generate documentation. The first is an assembly file produced by compiling the source code. The other is a pre-generated XML documentation file, usually produced by parsing the source code for special comments (C# compilers from .NET Framework and Mono support this using the "/doc" command-line argument).

The assembly file is queried using reflection to obtain the list of classes, methods, etc. The XML file is parsed for the documentation text.

NDoc uses plug-ins to support several different output formats, including CHM, Microsoft Help Viewer, MSDN-style web pages. Incomplete plug-ins are also included as starting points for developers, like the LaTeX plug-in and Javadoc-style web pages. NDoc comes with a graphical user interface to ease the generation process.

== Limitations and future development ==
The latest release version of NDoc does not support .NET Framework version 2.0. Although there are internal alpha versions that support .NET 2.0, as of 2006, there is very little activity on the NDoc project. The developer of NDoc, Kevin Downs, has said that he is not working on NDoc anymore due to lack of funding and threats against him, and that he is willing to hand over administration of the project. More recently, Kim Christensen picked up the ball and continues development of the original NDoc as NDoc3

== See also ==
- Doxygen - a mature document generation tool that can also build class diagrams and produce documentation from many other languages.
- Sandcastle — a similar application by Microsoft.
- Sandcastle Help File Builder — a freeware GUI front-end for Sandcastle that provides Ndoc-like features.
- Visual Expert - a documentation generator that also provides call trees, CRUD matrix, impact analysis, code review for PL/SQL, Transact-SQL and other languages.
- Comparison of documentation generators
