= VBdocman =

VBdocman allows commenting and the automatic generation of technical documentation from Visual Basic 6 source code files.

VBdocman parses the Visual Basic projects and automatically creates the table of contents, index, topics, cross-references and F1 context-sensitive help.

It can read Javadoc comments from the source code. VBdocman contains comment editor which helps writing comments. It is possible to insert pictures, links and other formatting directly into the source code.

The format of output documentation is configurable. Predefined formats are HTML Help, WinHelp, HTML, RTF and XML.

VBdocman has its successor VSdocman which supports VB .NET and C#.

== See also ==
- Comparison of documentation generators
