= MscGen =

Mscgen
- Developer(s): Michael McTernan
- Stable release: 0.20 / March 5, 2011; 14 years ago
- Written in: C
- Operating system: Cross-platform
- Type: Diagramming software
- License: GNU General Public License
- Website: www.mcternan.me.uk/mscgen

Mscgen (short for MSC generator) is a software tool for drawing message sequence charts from a simple to manage text-based source file. Rendered charts can be output in PNG, SVG and PostScript, with hyperlink information in ismap format. There is an extension for MediaWiki, Sphinx (documentation generator) and integration with Doxygen that allows embedding of charts into source code comments with generated automatically inserted into the generated documentation page. Mscgen is free software licensed under the GNU General Public License (GPL).

== Examples ==
The following example is from the author:

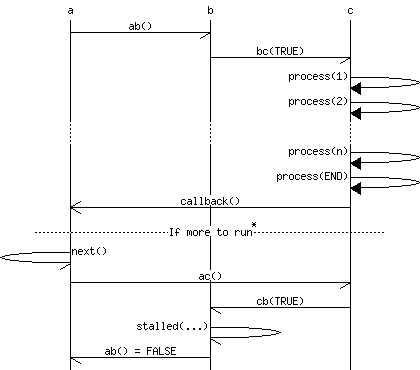
Sample Message Sequence Chart

msc {
  a,b,c;

  a->b  [label="ab()"] ;
  b->c  [label="bc(TRUE)"];
  c=>c  [label="process(1)"];
  c=>c  [label="process(2)"];
  ...;
  c=>c  [label="process(n)"];
  c=>c  [label="process(END)"];
  a<<=c [label="callback()"];
  ---   [label="If more to run", ID="*"];
  a->a  [label="next()"];
  a->c  [label="ac()"];
  b<-c  [label="cb(TRUE)"];
  b->b  [label="stalled(...)"];
  a<-b  [label="ab() = FALSE"];
}

Here are two examples of input and output for some standard SIP message flows:

=== Simple Call Flow ===
Simple SIP Call

msc {
  UAS1, UAC;

  UAS1->UAC [label="INVITE"];
  UAS1<-UAC [label="100 Trying"];
  UAS1<-UAC [label="180 Ringing"];
  ---      [label="the client plays ringing"];
  UAS1<-UAC [label="200 Ok"];
  UAS1->UAC [label="ACK"];
  ...;
  ---      [label="the client hangs up"];
  UAS1<-UAC [label="BYE"];
  UAS1<-UAC [label="200 Ok"];
}

=== Alice calls Bob with Intermediary Proxies ===
Alice Calls Bob

msc {
  Alice, P1, P2, Bob;

  Alice->P1 [label="INVITE"];
  Alice<-P1 [label="100 Trying"];
  P1->P2    [label="INVITE"];
  P1=>>P2    [label="100 Trying"];
  P2->Bob   [label="INVITE"];
  P2<-Bob   [label="100 Trying"];
  P2<-Bob   [label="180 Ringing"];
  P1<-P2    [label="180 Ringing"];
  Alice<-P1 [label="180 Ringing"];
  ---       [label="Alice's client plays ringing"];
  ...;
  ---       [label="Bob answers"];
  P2<-Bob   [label="200 Ok"];
  P1<-P2    [label="200 Ok"];
  Alice<-P1 [label="200 Ok"];
  Alice->P1 [label="ACK"];
  P1->P2    [label="ACK"];
  P2->Bob   [label="ACK"];
  ---       [label="two way media"];
  ...;
}

== See also ==
- Message Sequence Chart
- Doxygen
- Sphinx (documentation generator)
- GraphViz for similar software for directed graphing
- PlantUML
