= Pydoc =

Built-in documentation generator module for Python

Pydoc is the standard documentation module for the programming language Python. Similar to the functionality of Perldoc within Perl and Javadoc within Java, Pydoc allows Python programmers to access Python's documentation help files, generate text and HTML pages with documentation specifics, and find the appropriate module for a particular job.

Pydoc can be accessed from a module-specific GUI, from within the Python interpreter, or from a command line shell.

Developed by Ka-Ping Yee, it is included by default in all versions of Python since Python 2.1 and is available for download for 1.5.2, 1.6, and 2.0.

Pydoc is used to extract documentation from the source code itself. More comprehensive documentation is generated from external reStructuredText documents using the Sphinx documentation system.

== See also ==
- Comparison of documentation generators
