= PDOC =

PDOC may refer to:

- Pdoc software
- PetroDar Operating Company
- Prolonged disorder of consciousness
