= Read the Docs =

Software documentation hosting website

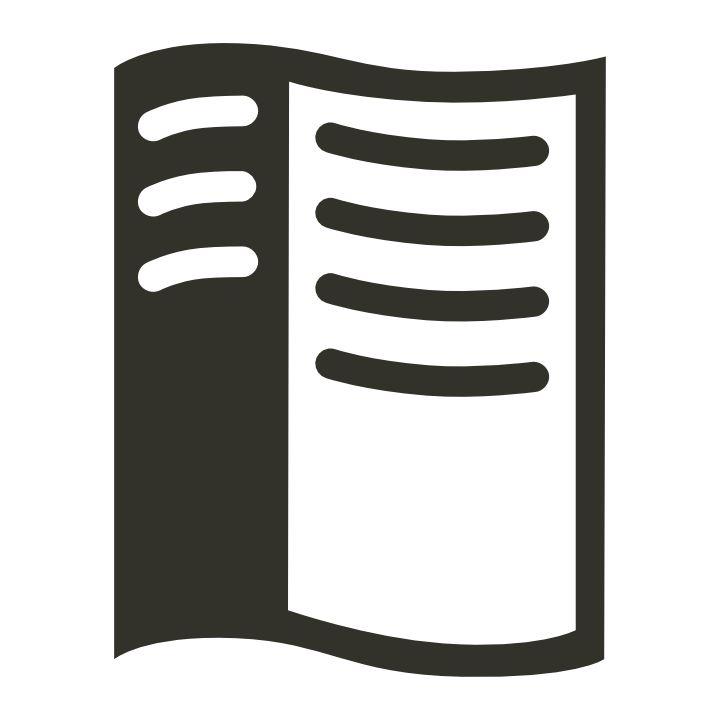
- Read the Docs Logo
- Country of origin: United States
- Founder(s): Eric Holscher, Anthony Johnson
- URL: readthedocs.org

Read the Docs
- Repository: github.com/rtfd/readthedocs.org
- Written in: Python
- License: MIT
- Website: readthedocs.org

Read the Docs is an open-sourced free software documentation hosting platform. It generates documentation written with the Sphinx documentation generator, MkDocs, or Jupyter Book.

== History ==
The site was created in 2010 by Eric Holscher, Bobby Grace, and Charles Leifer.

On March 9, 2011, the Python Software Foundation Board awarded a grant of US$840 to the Read the Docs project for one year of hosting fees. On November 13, 2017, the Linux Mint project announced that they were moving their documentation to Read the Docs. In 2020, Read the Docs received a $200,000 grant from the Chan Zuckerberg Initiative. For 2021, Read the Docs reported 700 million page views and 196 million unique visitors.

In 2013, a "Write the Docs" conference for Read the Docs users was launched, which has since turned into a generic software-documentation community. As of 2024, it continues to hold annual global conferences, organize local meetups, and maintain a Slack channel for "people who care about documentation."
