= Perl Programming Documentation =

Perl Programming Documentation, also called perldoc, is the name of the user manual for the Perl 5 programming language. It is available in several different formats, including online in HTML and PDF. The documentation is bundled with Perl in its own format, known as Plain Old Documentation (pod). Some distributions, such as Strawberry Perl, include the documentation in HTML, PDF, and pod formats.

perldoc is also the name of the Perl command that provides "access to all the documentation that comes with Perl", from the command line.

== See also ==
- Outline of Perl – overview of and topical guide to the Perl programming language
- Raku – Perl 5's sister language
- man page – form of software documentation usually found on a Unix or Unix-like operating system, invoked by issuing the man command. Perl documentation is sometimes available as man pages.
- RTFM – Internet slang for "Read the Frickin' Manual"
