= Google Closure Tools =

JavaScript developer toolkit

- Original author: Google
- Release: November 5, 2009
- Final release: v20230802 / 2 August 2023; 3 years ago
- Written in: Java
- Available in: JavaScript
- Type: Ajax framework
- License: Apache License 2.0
- Website: developers.google.com/closure/
- Repository: github.com/google/closure-compiler

Google Closure Tools is a set of tools built with the goal of helping developers optimize rich web applications with JavaScript. It was developed by Google for use in their web applications such as Gmail, Google Docs and Google Maps. As of August 1, 2024 the Closure Library has been sunset, for not "meeting the needs of modern JavaScript development".

== Closure Compiler ==
The Closure Compiler is a tool that compresses and optimizes JavaScript code, reducing its human readability. Unlike an actual compiler, it does not compile from JavaScript to machine code but rather minifies JavaScript.

The process executes the following steps:

1. Parses the submitted JavaScript
2. Analyzes the JavaScript
3. Removes any dead code
4. Rewrites and minifies what is left

It also checks syntax, variable references, and types and warns about common JavaScript pitfalls.

It supports transpiling modern ECMAScript code to ECMAScript 5 to achieve a wider range of browser compatibility, similar to Babel. This obviated Traceur Compiler, another project that supported transpiling ES6 to ES3.

The Closure compiler also supports type checking via JSDoc type annotations.

=== CLI ===
The Closure Compiler is available for use through command line tools:

- Java-based application run from the shell which compiles a list of specified JavaScript files
- npm package google-closure-compiler which provides three compilers: native binary executable (via GraalVM), Java and a JavaScript-based one

=== Closure Compiler Service ===
The Closure Compiler Service application provides a form for a user to input a URL pointing to a JavaScript source or enter JavaScript source code in a text box. The website will display the compiled JavaScript on the right side for the user to copy.

An API is available, accessible via POST requests, parameters include:

- The JavaScript to be optimized, or a URL pointing to it
- Optimization level
- Emit errors and warnings
- Output format i.e. JSON, XML, or text

The service is marked as deprecated and will eventually be removed.

=== Ecosystem ===
Programming languages that transpile to JavaScript can use the Closure Compiler in their toolchain. For example, the Closure Compiler is used in ClojureScript to optimize the compiled JavaScript.

=== Internals ===
Closure Compiler is built upon a modified version of the Rhino JS engine built by Mozilla, Google Guava, a Java standard library, Protocol Buffers, Gson and various other tools for testing. It also ships with built-in JavaScript JSDoc annotations for various popular projects like Node.js' standard API library, JQuery, and Google Map APIs.

== Closure Library ==
The Closure Library is a JavaScript library, written specifically to take advantage of the Closure Compiler, based on a modular architecture. It provides cross-browser functions for DOM manipulations and events, Ajax and JSON, as well as more high-level objects such as User Interface widgets and Controls.

== Closure Templates ==
Closure Templates are a templating system for dynamically generating HTML in both Java and JavaScript.

Since the language is referred to as "Soy" internally by Google, and "Soy" remains in some of the documentation and classes, sometimes Closure Templates are referred to as "Soy Templates".

== Closure Stylesheets ==
Closure Stylesheets provide extensions to CSS, which are transpiled to ordinary CSS. Internally in Google, this extended version of CSS is referred to as GSS.

As of November 2021, Closure Stylesheets have been deprecated in favor of tools such as Sass and PostCSS.

== See also ==
- Google Web Toolkit
- JSDoc
- TypeScript
- Minification (programming)
- Source-to-source compiler
