= JDiff =

JDiff is a Javadoc doclet which generates an HTML report of all the packages, classes, constructors, methods, and fields which have been removed, added or changed in any way, including their documentation, when two Java APIs are compared. Which can be used to described exactly what has changed between the two releases of a product. Only the API of each version is compared. It does not compare what the source code does when executed.
