= Ruby Document format =

Markup language

RD (Ruby Document) is a lightweight markup language for writing Ruby-related documents. It can be embedded in Ruby source code.

RD is a traditional format. In modern Ruby, developers tend to write documents in RDoc instead of RD.

== Use ==
Originally, most documentation in the Ruby world, including for Ruby itself, had been written in RD. Then in 2002, much of it was converted to RDoc format. Although, the Japanese version of the Ruby Reference Manual still remains in RD format.

RD is designed to be written by hand and easily read in its raw form. Most end-users however experience it after it has been converted into HTML or man pages.

RD can be embedded in Ruby code, and pure RD files usually have the extension .rd.

== Sample RD document ==
This document is syntactically correct RD, which attempts to follow the major conventions on section naming as well.

=begin
= NAME
RD sample - A sample RD document

= SYNOPSIS
 <syntaxhighlight lang="ruby" class="" style="border:none; padding: 0px 0px; color:var(--color-base, #202122); background:transparent; " inline="1">here.is_a?(Piece::Of::Code)</syntaxhighlight>
 <syntaxhighlight lang="ruby" class="" style="border:none; padding: 0px 0px; color:var(--color-base, #202122); background:transparent; " inline="1">print <<"END"</syntaxhighlight>
 This indented block will not be scanned for formatting
 codes or directives, and spacing will be preserved.
 END

= DESCRIPTION
Here's some normal text.  It includes text that is
((*emphasized*)), ((%keyboard%)), (({code}))-formatted,
((|variable part|)), ((:indexed:)), and (('as-is'))((-footnote-)).

== An Example List
* This is a bulleted list.
* Here's another item.
  * Nested list item.

== An ordered List
(1) This is the first item
(2) second
    * Nested unordered list.
(3) third
    (1) Nested ordered list
    (2) its second item

=end
=begin html
<syntaxhighlight lang="html" class="" style="border:none; padding: 0px 0px; color:var(--color-base, #202122); background:transparent; " inline="1"><img src="Example.png" align="right" alt="Figure 1." /></syntaxhighlight>
<syntaxhighlight lang="html" class="" style="border:none; padding: 0px 0px; color:var(--color-base, #202122); background:transparent; " inline="1"><p></syntaxhighlight>
    Here's some embedded HTML.  In this block I can 
    <syntaxhighlight lang="html" class="" style="border:none; padding: 0px 0px; color:var(--color-base, #202122); background:transparent; " inline="1">include images, apply <span style="color: green"></syntaxhighlight>
    <syntaxhighlight lang="html" class="" style="border:none; padding: 0px 0px; color:var(--color-base, #202122); background:transparent; " inline="1">styles</span>, or do anything else I can do with</syntaxhighlight>
    HTML.  RD processors that aren't outputting HTML will
    completely ignore it.
<syntaxhighlight lang="html" class="" style="border:none; padding: 0px 0px; color:var(--color-base, #202122); background:transparent; " inline="1"></p></syntaxhighlight>
=end
=begin
= COPYRIGHT
Copyright 2005 [[J. Random Hacker]] <jrh@cpan.org>.

Permission is granted to copy, distribute and/or modify this 
document under the terms of the [[GNU Free Documentation License]], 
Version 1.2 or any later version published by the 
[[Free Software Foundation]]; with no Invariant Sections, with 
no Front-Cover Texts, and with no Back-Cover Texts.
=end

HTML result

== NAME ==
RD sample - A sample RD document

== SYNOPSIS ==
here.is_a?(Piece::Of::Code)
print <<"END"
This indented block will not be scanned for formatting
codes or directives, and spacing will be preserved.
END

== DESCRIPTION ==
Here's some normal text. It includes text that is emphasized, keyboard, code-formatted, variable part, indexed, and as-is^{*1}.

== An Example List ==
- This is a bulleted list.
- Here's another item.
  - Nested list item.

== An ordered List ==
1. This is the first item
2. second

- Nested unordered list.

1. start=3
2. third

1. Nested ordered list
2. its second item

Here's some embedded HTML. In this block I can include images, apply styles, or do anything else I can do with HTML. RD processors that aren't outputting HTML will completely ignore it.

== COPYRIGHT ==
Copyright 2005 J. Random Hacker <jrh@cpan.org>. Permission is granted to copy, distribute and/or modify this document under the terms of the GNU Free Documentation License, Version 1.2 or any later version published by the Free Software Foundation; with no Invariant Sections, with no Front-Cover Texts, and with no Back-Cover Texts.

== See also ==
- Markdown
- Plain Old Documentation
