= JSDoc =

Documentation for JavaScript

- Initial release: 1999; 27 years ago
- Latest release: 4.0.4; 19 October 2024; 18 months ago
- Type of format: Programming documentation Format
- Contained by: JavaScript source files
- Extended from: JavaDoc
- Open format?: Yes
- Website: jsdoc.app

JSDoc is a markup language used to annotate and document JavaScript code. The comments can be processed by tools to produce documentation in formats such as HTML. The JSDoc specification is released under CC BY-SA 3.0, while its companion documentation generator and parser library is licensed under the Apache License 2.0.

== History ==
JSDoc's syntax and semantics are similar to those of the Javadoc scheme, which is used for documenting code written in Java. JSDoc differs from Javadoc, in that it is specialized to handle JavaScript's dynamic behaviour.

An early example using a Javadoc-like syntax to document JavaScript was released in 1999 with the Netscape/Mozilla project Rhino, a JavaScript run-time system written in Java. It included a toy "JSDoc" HTML generator, versioned up to 1.3, as an example of its JavaScript capabilities.

All main generations of "JSDoc" were headed by Michael Mathews. He started with JSDoc.pm in 2001, a simple system written in Perl. Later, with contributions by Canadian programmer Gabriel Reid. It was hosted on SourceForge in a CVS repository. By JSDoc 1.0 (2007) he rewrote the system in JavaScript (again for Rhino), and after a set of expansions JSDoc 2.0 (2008) gained the name "jsdoc-toolkit". Released under the MIT License, it was hosted in a Subversion repository on Google Code. By 2011 he had refactored the system into JSDoc 3.0, dropping "-toolkit" from the name, changing to the Apache License, and hosted the result on GitHub. It now runs on Node.js.

== JSDoc tags ==
Some of the more popular annotation tags used in modern JSDoc are:

Tag	Description
@author	Developer's name
@constructor	Marks a function as a constructor
@deprecated	Marks a method as deprecated
@exception	Synonym for @throws
@exports	Identifies a member that is exported by the module
@param	Documents a method parameter; a datatype indicator can be added between curly braces
@private	Signifies that a member is private
@returns	Documents a return value
@return	Synonym for @returns
@see	Documents an association to another object
@todo	Documents something that is missing/open
@this	Specifies the type of the object to which the keyword this refers within a function.
@throws	Documents an exception thrown by a method
@version	Provides the version number of a library

== JSDoc in use ==
- Google's Closure Linter and Closure Compiler. The latter extracts the type information to optimize its output JavaScript.
- TypeScript can perform type checking for JavaScript files with JSDoc type annotations. Microsoft has specified a new TSDoc language with extensible tags.
- Sublime Text supports JSDoc through the DocBlockr or DoxyDoxygen plugin
- The JSDoc syntax has been described at length in the Apress book Foundations of Ajax ISBN 1-59059-582-3.
- Various products of JetBrains, such as IntelliJ IDEA and WebStorm, NetBeans, Visual Studio Code and RubyMine understand JSDoc syntax.
- Eclipse-based Aptana Studio supports ScriptDoc.
- Mozile, the Mozilla Inline Editor uses JSDoc.pm.
- The Helma application framework uses JSDoc.
- SproutCore documentation was generated using JSDoc.
- Visual Studio, WebStorm and many other Integrated development environments or Text Editors offer Code Completion and other assistance based on JSDoc comments.
- Open source Atom editor supports JSDoc via the atom-easy-jsdoc plugin.

== See also ==
- Comparison of documentation generators
- Google Closure Tools
