= Doctest =

Software testing tool

doctest is a module included in the Python programming language's standard library that allows the easy generation of tests based on output from the standard Python interpreter shell, cut and pasted into docstrings.

== Implementation specifics ==
Doctest makes innovative use of the following Python capabilities:

- docstrings
- The Python interactive shell (both command line and the included idle application)
- Python introspection

When using the Python shell, the primary prompt: >>> , is followed by new commands. The secondary prompt: ... , is used when continuing commands on multiple lines; and the result of executing the command is expected on following lines. A blank line, or another line starting with the primary prompt is seen as the end of the output from the command.

The doctest module looks for such sequences of prompts in a docstring, re-executes the extracted command and checks the output against the output of the command given in the docstrings test example.

The default action when running doctests is for no output to be shown when tests pass. This can be modified by options to the doctest runner. In addition, doctest has been integrated with the Python unit test module allowing doctests to be run as standard unittest testcases. Unittest testcase runners allow more options when running tests such as the reporting of test statistics such as tests passed, and failed.

== Literate programming and doctests ==
Although doctest does not allow a Python program to be embedded in narrative text, it does allow for verifiable examples to be embedded in docstrings, where the docstrings can contain other text. Docstrings can in turn be extracted from program files to generate documentation in other formats such as HTML or PDF. A program file can be made to contain the documentation, tests, as well as the code and the tests easily verified against the code. This allows code, tests, and documentation to evolve together.

== Documenting libraries by example ==
Doctests are well suited to provide an introduction to a library by demonstrating how the API is used.

On the basis of the output of Python's interactive interpreter, text can be mixed with tests that exercise the library, showing expected results.

== Examples ==
Example one shows how narrative text can be interspersed with testable examples in a docstring. In the second example, more features of doctest are shown, together with their explanation. Example three is set up to run all doctests in a file when the file is run, but when imported as a module, the tests will not be run.

=== Example 1: A doctest embedded in the docstring of a function ===
def list_to_0_index(lst):
    """A solution to the problem given in:
    https://rgrig.blogspot.com/2005/11/writing-readable-code.html

    'Given a list, lst, say for each element the 0-index where it appears for
    the first time. So the list x = [0, 1, 4, 2, 4, 1, 0, 2] is
    transformed into y = [0, 1, 2, 3, 2, 1, 0, 3]. Notice that for all
    i we have x[y[i]] = x[i]. Use any programming language and any data
    representation you want.'

    >>> x = [0, 1, 4, 2, 4, 1, 0, 2]
    >>> list_to_0_index(x)
    [0, 1, 2, 3, 2, 1, 0, 3]
    >>>
    """

    return [lst.index(i) for i in lst]

=== Example 2: doctests embedded in a README.txt file ===
======================
Demonstration doctests
======================

This is just an example of what a README text looks like that can be used with
the doctest.DocFileSuite() function from Python's doctest module.

Normally, the README file would explain the API of the module, like this:

>>> a = 1
>>> b = 2
>>> a + b
3

Notice, that we just demonstrated how to add two numbers in Python, and 
what the result will look like.

A special option allows you to be somewhat fuzzy about your examples:

>>> o = object()
>>> o                 # doctest: +ELLIPSIS
<object object at 0x...>

Exceptions can be tested very nicely too:

>>> x
Traceback (most recent call last):
 ...
NameError: name 'x' is not defined

=== Example 3: unique_words.py ===
This example also simulates input to the function from a file by using the Python StringIO module

def unique_words(page):
    """Return set of the unique words in list of lines of text.

    Example:

    >>> from StringIO import StringIO
    >>> fileText = '''the cat sat on the mat
    ... the mat was ondur the cat
    ... one fish two fish red fish
    ... blue fish
    ... This fish has a yellow car
    ... This fish has a yellow star'''
    >>> file = StringIO(fileText)
    >>> page = file.readlines()
    >>> words = unique_words(page)
    >>> print sorted(list(words))
    ["This", "a", "blue", "car", "cat", "fish", "has", "mat",
     "on", "ondur", "one", "red", "sat", "star", "the", "two",
     "was", "yellow"]
    >>>
    """
    return set(word for line in page for word in line.split())

def _test():
    import doctest
    doctest.testmod()

if __name__ == "__main__":
    _test()

== Doctest and documentation generators ==
Both the EpyText format of Epydoc and Docutils' reStructuredText format support the markup of doctest sections within docstrings.

== Implementation in other programming languages ==
In C++, the doctest framework is the closest possible implementation of the concept – tests can be written directly in the production code with minimal overhead and the option to strip them from the binary.

The ExUnit.DocTest Elixir library implements functionality similar to Doctest.

An implementation of Doctest for Haskell.

Writing documentation tests in Elm.

Writing documentation tests in Rust.

Writing documentation tests in Elixir.

byexample supports writing doctests for several popular programming languages (e.g. Python, Ruby, Shell, JavaScript, C/C++, Java, Go, Rust) inside Markdown, reStructuredText and other text documents.
