= Ndoc =

Ndoc is an Albanian masculine given name. Notable people with the name include:

- Ndoc Çoba (1870–1945), Albanian economist, publicist and politician
- Ndoc Mark Gega (c. 1830–1907), Albanian patriot
- Ndoc Gjetja (1944–2010), Albanian poet
- Ndoc Martini (1880–1916), Albanian painter
- Ndoc Nikaj (1864–1951), Albanian priest, writer, and historian
