= Comparison of documentation generators =

The following tables compare general and technical information for a number of documentation generators. Please see the individual products' articles for further information. Unless otherwise specified in footnotes, comparisons are based on the stable versions without any add-ons, extensions or external programs. Note that many of the generators listed are no longer maintained.

== General information ==
Basic general information about the generators, including: creator or company, license, and price.

Name	Creator	Input format	Languages (alphabet order)	OS support	First public release date	Latest stable version	Software license
Doxygen	Dimitri van Heesch	Text	C/C++, C#, D, IDL, Fortran, Java, PHP, Python	Any	1997/10/26	1.16.1	GPL
fpdoc (Free Pascal Documentation Generator)	Sebastian Guenther and Free Pascal Core	Text	(Object)Pascal/Delphi	FPC tier 1 targets	2005	3.2.2	GPL reusable parts are GPL with static linking exception
Haddock	Simon Marlow	Text	Haskell	Any	2002	2.15.0 (2014)	BSD
HeaderDoc	Apple Inc.	Text	AppleScript, Bash, Csh, C, C++, Delphi, IDL, Java, JavaScript, MIG, Pascal, Perl, PHP, Python, Ruby, Tcl	Any Unix-like	2000/09/—	8.9.28 (2013)	APSL
Imagix 4D	Imagix Corp.	Text	C, C++, Java	Windows, Linux, Unix	1995	7.3	Proprietary
Javadoc	Sun Microsystems	Text	Java	Any	1995	1.6	GPL
JSDoc	Michael Mathews	Text	JavaScript	Any	2024/10/19	4.0.4	Apache
mkd	Jean-Paul Louyot	Text	Any with comments	Unix, Linux, Windows	1989	2015	EUPL GPL
MkDocs	Tom Christie	Text	Python	Any	2014/10/29	1.5.3	BSD
Natural Docs	Greg Valure	Text	Any with comments	Any	2003/05/26	2.0.2	GPL
NDoc	Jason Diamond, Jean-Claude Manoli, Kral Ferch	Binary	C#	Windows only	2003/07/27	1.3.1	GPL
pdoc	Andrew Gallant	Text	Python	Any	2013	1.0.1 (2021)	Unlicense (PD)
perldoc	Larry Wall	Text	Perl	Any	1994	5.16.3	Artistic, GPL
phpDocumentor	Joshua Eichorn	Text	PHP	Any	2000	3.0.0	LGPL for 1.x, MIT for 2+
pydoc	Ka-Ping Yee	Text	Python	Any	2000	in Python core	Python
RDoc	Dave Thomas	Text	C, C++, Ruby	Any	2001/12/14	in Ruby core	Ruby
ROBODoc	Frans Slothouber	Text	Any with comments	Any	1995/01/19	4.99.36 (2015)	GPL
Sandcastle	Microsoft	Text	.NET	Windows only	2008/05/—	2.4.10520 (2016)	Ms-PL
Sphinx	Georg Brandl	Text	Ada, C, C++, Chapel, CMake, Fortran, GraphQL, JavaScript, Matlab, PHP, Python, reStructuredText, Ruby, Rust, VB	Any	2008/03/21	8.2.1	BSD
Visual Expert	Novalys	Text, Binary	C#, PL/SQL, Transact-SQL, PowerBuilder	Windows only	1995	2017	Proprietary
YARD	Loren Segal	Text	Ruby	Any	2007/02/24	0.7.3	MIT
Name	Creator	Input format	Languages (alphabet order)	OS support	First public release date	Latest stable version	Software license

== Supported formats ==
The output formats the generators can write.

Generator name	HTML	CHM	RTF	PDF	LaTeX	PostScript	man pages	DocBook	XML	EPUB
fpdoc	Yes	Native	Yes	No	No	Yes	No	No	No	No
Haddock	Yes	Yes	No	No	No	No	No	Partial	No	No
HeaderDoc	Yes	No	No	No	No	No	Yes	No	Yes	No
Imagix 4D	Yes	No	Yes	No	No	No	No	No	No	No
Javadoc	Yes	Indirectly (Note: Via Doclets from Third Parties.)	Indirectly	Indirectly	Indirectly	Indirectly	Indirectly	Indirectly	Indirectly	No
JSDoc	Yes	No	No	No	No	No	No	No	No	No
MkDocs	Yes	No	No	No	No	No	No	No	No	No
Natural Docs	Yes	No	No	No	No	No	No	No	No	No
NDoc	Yes	Yes	No	No	No	No	No	No	No	No
pdoc	Yes	No	No	No	No	No	No	No	No	No
phpDocumentor	Yes	Yes (1.x only)	No	Yes (1.x only)	No	No	No	Yes (1.x only)	Yes (1.x only)	No
pydoc	Yes	No	No	No	No	No	No	No	No	No
RDoc	Yes	Yes (Note: RDoc currently only provides generators for CHM and XML documents in the RDoc version provided as part of the Ruby 1.9 Core.)	No	No	No	No	Indirectly (Note: RDoc generates documentation for RI, which is Ruby's version of the Unix man pages.)	No	Yes	No
ROBODoc	Yes	Indirectly	Yes	Indirectly (Note: Generated from the LaTeX output only)	Yes	Indirectly	Yes	Yes	No	No
Sandcastle	Yes	Yes	No	No	No	No	No	No	No	No
Sphinx	Yes	Yes	No	Indirectly	Yes	No	Yes	No	Yes	Yes
Visual Expert	Yes	No	No	No	No	No	No	No	No	No
YARD	Yes	No	No	No	No	No	No	No	No	No
Generator name	HTML	CHM	RTF	PDF	LaTeX	PostScript	man pages	DocBook	XML	EPUB

== Other features ==
	possibility of extended customization	generated diagrams	highlighting and linking of generated doc	parameter types extracted
Doxygen	with XSLT	caller and callee graphs, dependency graphs, inheritance diagrams, collaboration diagrams		
Haddock			Yes	Yes
HeaderDoc	Custom headers, footers, code coloring, and other CSS styles in individual pages. Project-wide TOC is generated from a user-defined template.		Configurable syntax highlighting/coloring with automatic linking to symbols in declaration, ability to manually link to symbols in discussion, etc.	Provides warnings if tagged parameters do not match code, parsed parameters included in XML output and Doxygen-style tagfile (-D flag in 8.7). Partial C preprocessor support with -p flag. Support for #if/#ifdef control over documentation inclusion using the -D and -U command-line flags.
Imagix 4D	customizable through style sheets and CSS	linked hierarchy and dependency graphs for function calls, variable sets and reads, class inheritance and interface, and file includes and interface, intra-function flow charts	fully cross-linked project-wide, including all hierarchy and dependency graphs, metrics tables, source code snippets, and source files	full semantic analysis of source code, including parameter types, conditional compilation directives, macro expansions
Javadoc				
JSDoc				Yes
mkd	Customisable for all type of comments	'as-is' in comments	all general documentation; references, manual, organigrams, ... Including the binary codes included in the comments.	all coded comments
MkDocs				
Natural Docs				
NDoc				
perldoc	Extend the generator classes through Perl programming.		Only linking	
pdoc	overridable Jinja2 templates		source code syntax highlighting, automatic cross-linking to symbol declarations	Yes
phpDocumentor	Smarty-based templates (1.x), Twig-based templates (2+)	class inheritance diagrams	cross reference to generated documentation, and to php.net function reference	Yes
pydoc				
RDoc				
ROBODoc				
Sphinx	Customizable themes (10 first-party); Jinja templating; Python plugins	class inheritance diagrams, graphviz, third party (e.g. using aafigure, actdiag, Google Chart, gnuplot, mermaid)	Automatic cross-referencing (including between projects), Index; Table of Contents, Syntax highlighting with Pygments	custom objects (such as functions and classes)
Visual Expert	documentation content and styles customizable	Class inheritance, call trees, dependencies (impact analysis)	internal links between classes, methods, variables, tables, columns...	all types extracted
YARD	customizable Ruby templates	class diagrams with extra tool	internal classes/modules cross-referenced and Ruby source highlighted	

== See also ==
- Code readability
- Documentation generator
- Literate programming
- Self-documenting code
