= Docstring =

String literal that provides documentation per computer programming language syntax

A docstring is a string literal that annotates an associated section of source code. It provides for the same utility as a comment, but unlike a comment is a string literal and is retained as part of the running program. Some development tools display docstring information as part of an interactive help system.

Programming languages that support docstring include Python, Lisp, Elixir, Clojure, Gherkin, Julia and Haskell. Tools that leverage docstring text include cobra-doc (Cobra), doctest (Python), Pydoc (Python), Sphinx (Python).

== Examples ==
=== Elixir ===
Documentation is supported at language level, in the form of docstrings. Markdown is Elixir's de facto markup language of choice for use in docstrings:

def module MyModule do
  @moduledoc """
  Documentation for my module. With **formatting**.
  """

  @doc "Hello"
  def world do
    "World"
  end
end

=== Lisp ===
In Lisp, a docstring is known as a documentation string. The Common Lisp standard states that a particular implementation may choose to discard docstrings. When they are kept, docstrings may be viewed and changed using the DOCUMENTATION function. For instance:

 (defun foo () "hi there" nil)
 (documentation #'foo 'function) => "hi there"

=== Python ===
In Python, a docstring is a string literal that follows a module, class or function definition. It must be nothing but a string literal, not any other kind of expression. The docstring is accessible via the associated code element's __doc__ attribute and the help function.

The following Python code declares docstrings for each program element:

"""The module's docstring"""

class MyClass:
    """The class's docstring"""

    def my_method(self):
        """The method's docstring"""

If saved as mymodule.py, the following is an interactive session showing how the docstrings may be accessed:

>>> import mymodule
>>> help(mymodule)
The module's docstring
>>> help(mymodule.MyClass)
The class's docstring
>>> help(mymodule.MyClass.my_method)
The method's docstring

== See also ==
- docblock – Source code comment formatted for automated documentation generation
- Literate programming – Approach to software development
- Plain Old Documentation – Markup language for Perl documentation
