= Sphinx (documentation generator) =

Documentation generator

- Developers: Georg Brandl, Adam Turner
- Initial release: March 21, 2008
- Stable release: 9.0.4 / 4 December 2025; 3 months ago
- Written in: Python
- Operating system: Cross-platform
- Type: Documentation generator
- License: BSD
- Website: www.sphinx-doc.org
- Repository: github.com/sphinx-doc/sphinx

Sphinx is a documentation generator written and used by the Python community. It is written in Python, and also used in other environments.

== Purpose and function ==
Sphinx converts reStructuredText files into HTML websites and other formats including PDF, EPub, Texinfo and man.

reStructuredText is extensible, and Sphinx exploits its extensible nature through a number of extensions – for autogenerating documentation from source code, writing mathematical notation or highlighting source code, etc.

It is possible to use Markdown files as well thanks to extensions such as MyST Parser.

=== HTML themes ===
Sphinx provides the ability to apply themes to HTML and HTML-based formats. Sphinx has several built-in themes, including alabaster, classic, sphinxdoc, and scrolls. Popular themes that can be installed as Python modules include:

- Read the Docs
- Sphinx Bootstrap
- Guzzle
- Documatt

== History and use ==
The first public release, version 0.1.61611, was announced on March 21, 2008. It was developed for, and is used extensively by, the Python project for documentation.

Since its introduction in 2008, Sphinx has been adopted by many other important Python projects, including Bazaar, SQLAlchemy, MayaVi, SageMath, SciPy, Django and Pylons. It is also used for the Blender user manual and Python API documentation.

In 2010, Eric Holscher announced the creation of the Read the Docs project as part of an effort to make maintenance of software documentation easier. Read the Docs automates the process of building and uploading Sphinx documentation after every commit.

=== Linux kernel ===
The Linux kernel's documentation subsystem underwent changes in 2016. Starting in the 4.7 cycle, the documentation started switching over to use Sphinx.

- Talk at LCA2016: What I've learned as the kernel docs maintainer on YouTube
- Talk at LCA2017: Kernel documentation: what we have and where it's going on YouTube

== See also ==
- Comparison of documentation generators
- Read the Docs
- reStructuredText
