= Documentation generator =

Automation technology for creating software documentation

In software development, a documentation generator is an automation technology that generates documentation. A generator is often used to generate API documentation which is generally for programmers or operational documents (such as a manual) for end users. A generator often pulls content from source, binary or log files. Some generators, such as Javadoc and Doxygen, use special source code comments to drive content and formatting.

== See also ==
- Comparison of documentation generators
- Template processor
- Static code analysis
- Literate programming
- Integrated development environment
