= Microsoft Help =

Microsoft Help may refer to:

- Microsoft WinHelp, Windows 3.0
- Microsoft Compiled HTML Help, Internet Explorer 4 and Windows 98
- Microsoft Assistance Markup Language, Windows Vista
- Microsoft Help 2, the help system used by Visual Studio 2002/2003/2005/2008 and Office 2007
- Microsoft Help Viewer, the help system used by Visual Studio 2010
