= Single-source publishing =

Content publishing method

Single-source publishing, also known as single-sourcing publishing, is a content management method which allows the same source content to be used across different forms of media and more than one time. The labor-intensive and expensive work of editing need only be carried out once, on only one document; that source document (the single source of truth) can then be stored in one place and reused. This reduces the potential for error, as corrections are only made one time in the source document.

The benefits of single-source publishing primarily relate to the editor rather than the user. The user benefits from the consistency that single-sourcing brings to terminology and information. This assumes the content manager has applied an organized conceptualization to the underlying content (A poor conceptualization can make single-source publishing less useful). Single-source publishing is sometimes used synonymously with multi-channel publishing though whether or not the two terms are synonymous is a matter of discussion.

== Definition ==
While there is a general definition of single-source publishing, there is no single official delineation between single-source publishing and multi-channel publishing, nor are there any official governing bodies to provide such a delineation. Single-source publishing is most often understood as the creation of one source document in an authoring tool and converting that document into different file formats or human languages (or both) multiple times with minimal effort. Multi-channel publishing can either be seen as synonymous with single-source publishing, or similar in that there is one source document but the process itself results in more than a mere reproduction of that source.

== History ==
The origins of single-source publishing lie, indirectly, with the release of Windows 3.0 in 1990. With the eclipsing of MS-DOS by graphical user interfaces, help files went from being unreadable text along the bottom of the screen to hypertext systems such as WinHelp. On-screen help interfaces allowed software companies to cease the printing of large, expensive help manuals with their products, reducing costs for both producer and consumer. This system raised opportunities as well, and many developers fundamentally changed the way they thought about publishing. Writers of software documentation did not simply move from being writers of traditional bound books to writers of electronic publishing, but rather they became authors of central documents which could be reused multiple times across multiple formats.

The first single-source publishing project was started in 1993 by Cornelia Hofmann at Schneider Electric in Seligenstadt, using software based on Interleaf to automatically create paper documentation in multiple languages based on a single original source file.

XML, developed during the mid- to late-1990s, was also significant to the development of single-source publishing as a method. XML, a markup language, allows developers to separate their documentation into two layers: a shell-like layer based on presentation and a core-like layer based on the actual written content. This method allows developers to write the content only one time while switching it in and out of multiple different formats and delivery methods.

In the mid-1990s, several firms began creating and using single-source content for technical documentation (Boeing Helicopter, Sikorsky Aviation and Pratt & Whitney Canada) and user manuals (Ford owners manuals) based on tagged SGML and XML content generated using the Arbortext Epic editor with add-on functions developed by a contractor. The concept behind this usage was that complex, hierarchical content that did not lend itself to discrete componentization could be used across a variety of requirements by tagging the differences within a single document using the capabilities built into SGML and XML. Ford, for example, was able to tag its single owner's manual files so that 12 model years could be generated via a resolution script running on the single completed file. Pratt & Whitney, likewise, was able to tag up to 20 subsets of its jet engine manuals in single-source files, calling out the desired version at publication time. World Book Encyclopedia also used the concept to tag its articles for American and British versions of English.

Starting from the early 2000s, single-source publishing was used with an increasing frequency in the field of technical translation. It is still regarded as the most efficient method of publishing the same material in different languages. Once a printed manual was translated, for example, the online help for the software program which the manual accompanies could be automatically generated using the method. Metadata could be created for an entire manual and individual pages or files could then be translated from that metadata with only one step, removing the need to recreate information or even database structures.

Although single-source publishing is now decades old, its importance has increased urgently as of the 2010s. As consumption of information products rises and the number of target audiences expands, so does the work of developers and content creators. Within the industry of software and its documentation, there is a perception that the choice is to embrace single-source publishing or render one's operations obsolete.

== Criticism ==
Editors using single-source publishing have been criticized for below-standard work quality, leading some critics to describe single-source publishing as the "conveyor belt assembly" of content creation.

While heavily used in technical translation, there are risks of error in regard to indexing. While two words might be synonyms in English, they may not be synonyms in another language. In a document produced via single-sourcing, the index will be translated automatically and the two words will be rendered as synonyms. This is because they are synonyms in the source language, while in the target language they are not.

== See also ==
- Content management
- Darwin Information Typing Architecture
- EPUB
- Markup language
- DocBook

=== List of single-source publishing tools ===
- Adobe FrameMaker
- Adobe RoboHelp
- Apache Cocoon
- Altova
- Booktype
- DocBook XSL
- DITA Open Toolkit
- GNU Texinfo
- HelpNDoc
- Oxygen XML editor
- Sphinx
