= Help authoring tool =

Software to aid production of "help" systems

A Help Authoring Tool or HAT is a software program used by technical writers to create online help systems.

== Functions ==
The basic functions of a Help Authoring Tool (HAT) can be divided into the following categories:

=== File input ===
HATs obtain their source text either by importing it from a file produced by another program, or by allowing the author to create the text within the tool by using an editor. File formats that can be imported vary from HAT to HAT. Acceptable file formats can include ASCII, HTML, OpenOffice Writer and Microsoft Word, and compiled Help formats such as Microsoft WinHelp and Microsoft Compiled HTML Help.

=== Help output ===
The output from a HAT can be either a compiled Help file in a format, such as WinHelp (*.HLP) or Microsoft Compiled HTML Help (*.CHM), or noncompiled file formats such as Adobe PDF, XML, HTML or JavaHelp.

=== Auxiliary functions ===
Some HATs provide extra functions such as:

- Automatic or assisted Index generation
- Automatic Table of Contents
- Spelling checker
- Image editing
- Image hotspot editing
- Import and export of text in XML files, for exchange with computer-assisted translation programs

== Common help authoring tools ==
Some common HATs include:

- HelpNDoc
- Adobe RoboHelp
- HelpSmith
- Doc-To-Help
- MadCap Flare
- Help & Manual
- Sandcastle
- AsciiDoc

== Related software ==
Technical writers often use content management systems and version control systems to manage their work.

== See also ==
- List of help authoring tools
- User assistance
