= Context-sensitive help =

Help specific to the current use of a system

Context-sensitive help is a kind of online help that is obtained from a specific point in the state of the software, providing help for the situation that is associated with that state.

Context-sensitive help, as opposed to general online help or online manuals, does not need to be accessible for reading as a whole. Each topic is supposed to describe extensively one state, situation, or feature of the software.

Context-sensitive help can be implemented using tooltips, which either provide a terse description of a GUI widget or display a complete topic from the help file. Other commonly used ways to access context-sensitive help start by clicking a button. One way uses a per widget button that displays the help immediately. Another way changes the pointer shape to a question mark, and then, after the user clicks a widget, the help appears.

Context-sensitive help is common in GUI environments. Examples include Apple's System 7 Balloon help, Microsoft's WinHelp, OS/2's INF Help or Sun's JavaHelp.

== See also ==
- Balloon Help
- Tooltip
- AnswerDash
