= Adobe eLearning Suite =

Adobe Systems software

- Developer: Adobe Systems
- Final release: v6.0 / July 18, 2012
- Operating system: Windows, Mac OS X
- License: Proprietary
- Website: Adobe eLearning Suite

Adobe eLearning Suite was a collection of applications made by Adobe Systems for learning professionals, instructional designers, training managers, content developers, and educators.

The suite allowed users to author, manage, and publish interactive instructional information including screencast demonstrations, simulations, and other interactive content.

The Adobe Flash and Dreamweaver applications included in this Suite were special versions that contained additional features to improve the workflow and integration between the applications. These versions were available only as part of the suite and can not be purchased separately.

Adobe eLearning Suite was the only way to legally get Adobe Creative Suite 6 applications (other than getting a boxed copy of Adobe Creative Suite 6) without Creative Cloud.

== History ==
Prior to its acquisition by Adobe Systems, Macromedia had a product bundle known as eLearning Suite 2004, which included Flash MX 2004, Dreamweaver MX 2004, and Authorware 7. The following list shows the different details of the various Adobe eLearning Suite versions:

- eLearning Suite 1 was released in January 2009 containing Captivate 4, Flash CS4 Professional, Dreamweaver CS4, Presenter 7, Acrobat 9 Pro, Photoshop CS4 Extended, Soundbooth CS4, Device Central CS4, Bridge CS4, and SCORM Packager.
- eLearning Suite 2 was released in May 2010 containing Captivate 5, Flash Professional CS5, Dreamweaver CS5, Presenter 7 (only for the windows version), Acrobat 9 Pro, Photoshop CS5 Extended, and Soundbooth CS5. eLearning Suite 2 was the first versions to be available for both Microsoft Windows and Apple Mac OS X platforms. Version 1 had only been available for Microsoft Windows.
- eLearning Suite 2.5 was released in May 2011 containing Captivate 5.5, Flash Professional CS5.5, Dreamweaver CS5.5, Photoshop CS5.1 Extended, Acrobat X Pro, Audition CS5.5 (replacing Soundbooth, which had been included in eLS 2), Bridge CS5, Device Central CS5.5, and Presenter 7 (only for the Windows version).
- eLearning Suite 6 was released in July 2012 containing Captivate 6, Flash Professional CS6, Dreamweaver CS6, Photoshop CS6 Extended, Acrobat XI Pro, Audition CS 6, Bridge CS6 and Presenter 8 (only for the Windows version).

== Applications ==
The following table shows the different details of the core applications in the various Adobe eLearning Suite versions. Each version may come with all these apps included or only a subset.

Product name	eLS version	Available in Creative Suite	Available in Creative Cloud
Acrobat	since version 1	Yes	
Audition	since version 2.5	Yes	
Bridge	since version 1	Yes	
Captivate	since version 1	Available in Adobe Technical Communication Suite	
Device Central	until version 2.5	Yes	Replaced by Creative Cloud desktop app
Dreamweaver	since version 1	Yes	Yes
Flash Professional (now Animate)	since version 1	Yes	Yes
Photoshop Extended	since version 1	Yes	Merged with Photoshop
Presenter	since version 1	Available in Adobe Technical Communication Suite	
SCORM Packager	only on version 1	No	
Soundbooth	until version 2	Yes	Replaced by Audition

== Versions ==
- eLearning Suite 1 (January 2009), containing Captivate 4, Flash CS4 Professional, Dreamweaver CS4, Presenter 7, Acrobat 9 Pro, Photoshop CS4 Extended, Soundbooth CS4, Device Central CS4, Bridge CS4, and SCORM Packager.
- eLearning Suite 2 (May 2010), containing Captivate 5, Flash Professional CS5, Dreamweaver CS5, Presenter 7 (only for the windows version), Acrobat 9 Pro, Photoshop CS5 Extended, and Soundbooth CS5.
- eLearning Suite 2.5 (May 2011), containing Captivate 5.5, Flash Professional CS5.5, Dreamweaver CS5.5, Photoshop CS5.1 Extended, Acrobat X Pro, Audition CS5.5 (replacing Soundbooth, which had been included in eLS 2), Bridge CS5, Device Central CS5.5, and Presenter 7 (only for the Windows version).
- eLearning Suite 6 (July 2012), containing Captivate 6, Flash Professional CS6, Dreamweaver CS6, Photoshop CS6 Extended, Acrobat XI Pro, Audition CS 6, Bridge CS6 and Presenter 8 (only for the Windows version).

== See also ==
- Adobe Creative Cloud
- Adobe Creative Suite
- Adobe Technical Communication Suite
