= HelpSmith =

Windows-based help authoring tool

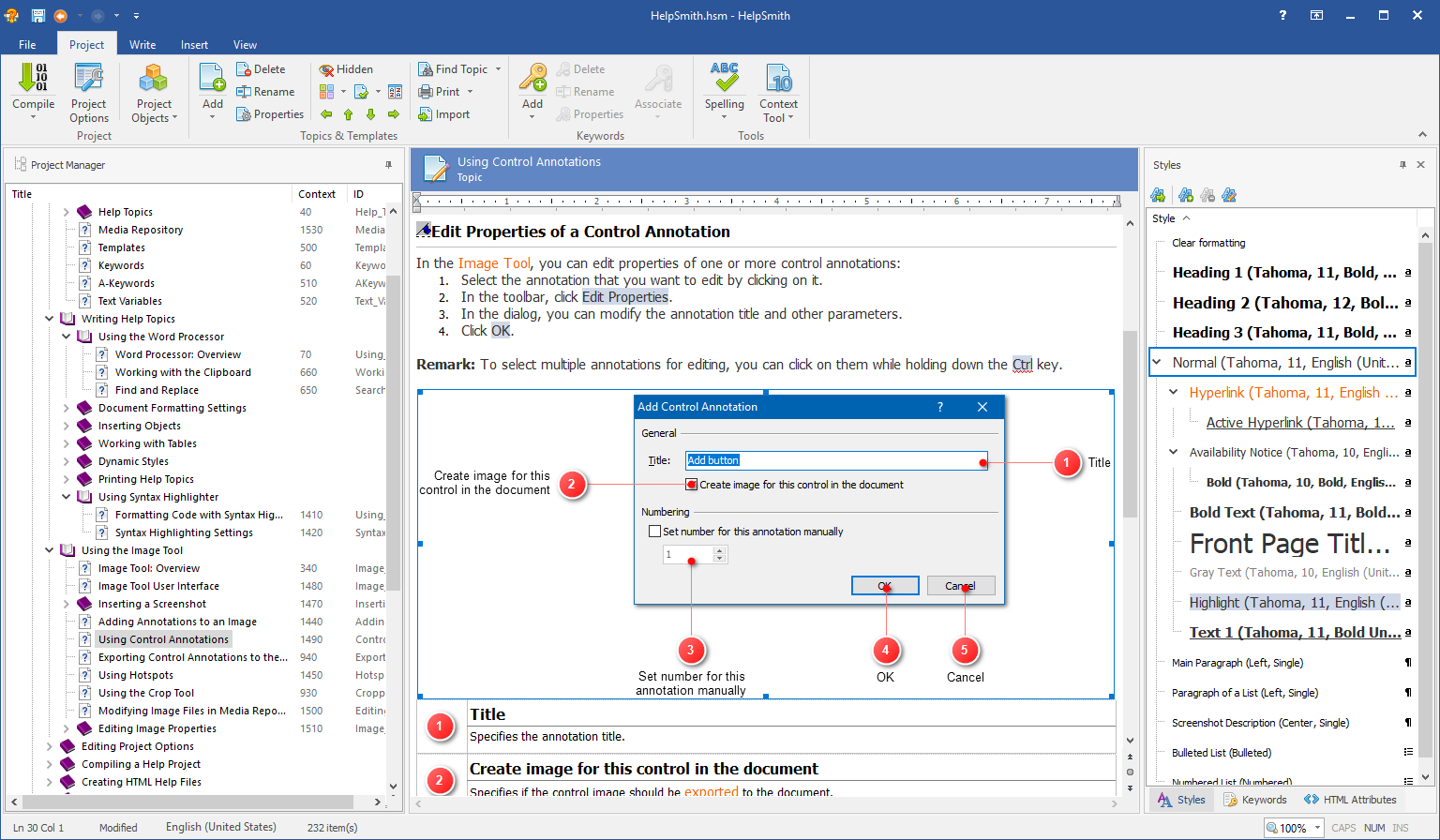
- Developer: Divcom Software
- Stable release: 11.1 / October 15, 2026; 7 days ago
- Operating system: Microsoft Windows
- Available in: English
- Type: IDE
- License: Trialware
- Website: www.helpsmith.com

HelpSmith is a Windows-based help authoring tool published by Divcom Software.

HelpSmith allows a technical writer to create documentation in various formats, such as HTML Help (CHM), Web Help (HTML-based help system), PDF, ePub, and Markdown. Also, HelpSmith includes screen capture and image annotation tools.

== History ==
Version 1.0 of HelpSmith was released in 2007 as a help authoring tool that had support for a single HTML Help (CHM) format. On February 7, 2008, HelpSmith was presented on the Giveaway of the Day website where the product received initial feedback and feature requests from its users.

Over the past few years, HelpSmith has obtained support for the major documentation formats, support for High DPI displays, improvements to the user interface, and other enhancements.

== Key features ==
Similarly to common help authoring tools, HelpSmith includes a word processor to edit the content of help topics, customizable templates, user-defined variables, the ability to import existing documentation, media files management tools, support for various output formats, conditional compilation capabilities, and other functions.

== Image editing capabilities ==
The integrated Image Tool can be used by a technical writer to capture screenshots of an application or website, and to add annotations for elements demonstrated on a screenshot. The Image Tool also has support for control annotations which can be used for creation of user interface documentation.

== Awards ==
- On the G2 Crowd website, HelpSmith has been marked as a high performer (Fall 2020, Winter 2021) in the category of "help authoring tool" (HAT) software, and is placed in the list of top help authoring tools. The G2 Crowd score is based on the ratings from real users, which takes into account the factors, such as the ease of use, ease of setup, quality of support, compliance with requirements, and others.
- On October 30, 2019, Visual Studio Magazine announced the winners of its 26th annual Reader's Choice Awards where HelpSmith was chosen as the Silver winner in the "help authoring" category.
- On January 27, 2021, Visual Studio Magazine announced the winners of its 27th annual Reader's Choice Awards where HelpSmith was chosen as the Silver winner in the "help authoring" category.

== Licensing terms ==
HelpSmith is available as a free trial version that can be downloaded for evaluation purposes from the official website. A single-user (per seat) license allows a customer to install HelpSmith Standard or HelpSmith Professional Edition on the main computer, and on a second computer, such as laptop. A multiple-user (floating) license allows a customer to install HelpSmith Terminal Server Edition on a terminal server in the client/server environment for concurrent usage by multiple users.

== See also ==
- Help authoring tool
- List of help authoring tools
- Technical writer
- Technical communication
- Software documentation
