= Microsoft Help Viewer =

Offline help system by Microsoft

- Developer: Microsoft
- Operating system: Microsoft Windows
- Predecessor: Microsoft Help 2
- Type: Help system

Microsoft Help Viewer (HV) is the offline help system (local help) developed by Microsoft that ships with versions of Microsoft Windows including and subsequent to Windows 8, as well as Visual Studio 2010 and its associated MSDN Library.

Microsoft Help Viewer 1.x supersedes Microsoft Help 2 which is the help system used by Microsoft Visual Studio 2002/2003/2005/2008 and Office 2007. It is shipped with VS 2010. Microsoft Help Viewer 2.x is backwards-compatible with 1.x and is shipped with the operating system as well as VS 2012+.

Although Microsoft Help Viewer was referred to as MS Help 3.x during development, it is a wholly new product and technically unrelated to Microsoft Help 2. With the growing need for a general Unicode-based help system, has become the default help system for Windows 10.

== History ==
- Jan 2008 - April Reagan [MS PM] blogs that Microsoft will replace Microsoft Help 2.
- Apr 2009 - At WritersUA 2009 conference April Reagan and Anand Raman announced Microsoft Help 3 will ship with Visual Studio 2010.
- Nov 2009 - Preview of new offline help ships with the VS 2010 Beta 2.
- Jan 2010 - Formal name changed from Microsoft Help 3.0 to Microsoft Help Viewer 1.0
- April 2010 - Microsoft Help Viewer 1.0 is RTM (Release to Manufacturing) as part of the Visual Studio 2010 release.
- March 2011 - Microsoft Help Viewer 1.1 ships with Service Pack 1 of Visual Studio 2010.
- August 2012 - Microsoft Help Viewer 2.0 ships with Visual Studio 2012 and the Windows 8 OS.

The HelpPane Viewer is found in Windows 10. The version appears to be 2.3.

== User Experience ==
The user experience for Microsoft Help Viewer 1.x is that topics can be viewed in any installed web browser – a separate application, such as the Microsoft Document Explorer included with Microsoft Help 2, is not necessary. The browser-based model is meant to provide a more lightweight navigation, downloading, and reading experience than earlier help-viewer models.

Visual Studio 2010 includes a taskbar applet in the Windows notification area (system tray) that arbitrates between viewing offline help and online help in the browser when F1 is pressed, and resolves help topic URIs to the proper topic page. It also includes a "library manager" application to manage the download, installation and uninstallation of help topics on the system, as well as whether to prefer online help when connected to the Internet.

Microsoft Help Viewer 2.0 uses a COM runtime library, so the taskbar applet is no longer used. The format is unchanged. The runtime API is accessible via .NET dlls used in VS2012 and Windows 8; they are equivalent except for a name change. VS2012 ships a more sophisticated toolkit (HlpViewer and HlpCtntMgr), while Windows 8 only has a one-pane HelpPane program.

== File format ==
Help files from Microsoft Help Viewer have a .mshc file extension. They are ordinary Zip files containing HTML documents. Special meta tags are provided for navigation, and there is support for signing the help bundle.

== See also ==
- Microsoft WinHelp
- Microsoft Compiled HTML Help
- Microsoft Help 2
