= HXS =

HXS or hxs may refer to:

- HXS, Allied convoy code for slow convoys from New York City to Liverpool from 1939 to 1945
- .hxs, file extension for Microsoft Help 2
- Hard X-ray Spectrometer, an instrument in Yohkoh
- HXS, stock symbol for Horizons S&P 500 Index ETF, a Canadian exchange-traded funds
- HXS, division code for Changyuan, China
