= Adobe Technical Communication Suite =

Adobe Software suite

- Developer: Adobe
- Initial release: September 25, 2007
- Stable release: 2019 / August 2018
- Operating system: Microsoft Windows
- Platform: 'IA-32' (i386), 'x86-64'
- Available in: English, French, German, Japanese
- License: Proprietary commercial software
- Website: adobe.com/products/technicalcommunicationsuite/

Adobe Technical Communication Suite is a collection of applications made by Adobe for technical communicators, help authors, instructional designers, and eLearning and training design professionals. It includes Adobe FrameMaker, Adobe RoboHelp, Adobe Acrobat, Adobe Captivate, and Adobe Presenter.

The suite allows users to author, manage, and publish interactive instructional information from technical documents and books to online help systems, knowledge bases, interactive training, and eLearning contents.

== History ==
Version 1
The suite was announced on September 25, 2007, consisting of Adobe FrameMaker 8, Adobe RoboHelp 7, Adobe Captivate 3 and Adobe Acrobat 8, and updated to version 1.3 on June 2, 2008, to reflect the addition of Acrobat 9 Pro Extended to the package. It is noted that the FrameMaker 8 and RoboHelp 7 applications included in this Suite were special versions that contained additional features that improved the workflow and integration between the applications. These versions were only available as part of the suite and could not be purchased separately.

Version 2
Announced on January 20, 2009; adds Adobe Photoshop CS4 and Presenter 7 to the suite, plus FrameMaker 9, RoboHelp 8 and Captivate 4.

Version 2.5
Announced in June 2010; adds Adobe Photoshop CS5 and Adobe Captivate 5 to the suite.

Version 3.0
Announced on January 11, 2011; saw the update to Adobe FrameMaker 10, Adobe RoboHelp 9, Adobe Captivate 5, Adobe Photoshop CS5 and Acrobat X Pro. Adobe Bridge is included in the installer package. Adobe Presenter, which has been available in previous versions, has been removed.

Version 3.5
Released in August 2011; saw the update to Adobe Captivate 5.5.

Version 4.0
Announced in July 2012; saw the update to Adobe FrameMaker 11, Adobe RoboHelp 10, Adobe Captivate 6 and Acrobat X Pro or Acrobat XI Pro. Adobe Illustrator CS6 and Adobe Presenter 8 are included in this Suite. Adobe Photoshop has been removed.

Version 5.0
Launched in January 2014; Adobe Technical Communication Suite 5 combines Adobe Captivate 7, Adobe FrameMaker 12, Adobe RoboHelp 11, Adobe Acrobat XI Pro, and Adobe Presenter 9, as well as additional tools such as RoboScreenCapture and RoboSource Control.

Version 2015
Launched in June 2015; Adobe Technical Communication Suite 6 combines Adobe Captivate 9, Adobe FrameMaker (2015 Release), Adobe RoboHelp (2015 Release), Adobe Acrobat Pro DC (2015 Release), and Adobe Presenter 10, as well as additional tools such as RoboScreenCapture and RoboSource Control.

Version 2017
Launched in January 2017; Adobe Technical Communication Suite 2017 combines Adobe Captivate 9, Adobe FrameMaker (2017 Release), Adobe RoboHelp (2017 Release), Adobe Acrobat Pro DC, and Adobe Presenter 10.

Version 2019
Launched in August 2018; Adobe Technical Communication Suite 2019 combines Adobe Captivate (2019 Release), Adobe FrameMaker (2019 Release), Adobe RoboHelp Classic (2019 Release), the new Adobe RoboHelp (2019 Release), Adobe Acrobat Pro (Pro DC in the subscription version), and Adobe Presenter 11.1.

Summer 2020 release
Launched in July 2020; Adobe Technical Communication Suite summer 2020 release combines Adobe Captivate (2019 Release), Adobe FrameMaker (2020 Release), Adobe RoboHelp (2020 Release), Adobe Acrobat Pro (Pro DC in the subscription version), and Adobe Presenter 11.1.

== Technical Communication Suite programs ==
The following table shows the different details of the core applications in the various Adobe Technical Communication Suite versions. Each version may come with all these apps included or only a subset.

Product name	TCS version	Available in eLearning Suite	Available in Creative Cloud
Acrobat	since version 1	Yes	Yes
Bridge	from version 3 to 3.5	Yes	Yes
Captivate	since version 1	Yes	No
Captivate Prime	since version 2015	No	No
FrameMaker	since version 1	No	No
FrameMaker Publishing Server	since version 1	No	No
Illustrator	only on version 4	No	Yes
Photoshop	from version 2 to 3.5	Yes, as Photoshop Extended	Yes
Presenter	since version 2	Yes	No
Presenter Video Express	since version 4	No	No
RoboHelp	since version 2019	No	No
RoboHelp Classic	since version 1	No	No
RoboHelp Server	since version 1	No	No
RoboScreenCapture	since version 5	No	No

== See also ==
- Adobe Creative Suite
- Adobe eLearning Suite
