= Helpline =

Support or help service provided via telephone

A helpline, or switchboard, is a telephone service which offers help to those who call. Many helpline services now offer more than telephone support - offering access to information, advice or customer service via telephone, email, web or SMS. The word hotline is also sometimes used to refer to a helpline. A helpline can provide emotional support to a person in distress in its minimalistic form. It may help the individual.

Services include:

- user assistance, for example computer software support
- telephone counseling, medical hotlines, insolvency hotlines, crisis hotlines and many other types of hotlines.

== See also ==
- Telephone counseling
- Hotline
- Single Non-Emergency Number
- Emergency telephone number
- Ask Foy
