= SHG =

SHG or shg may refer to:

== Language ==
- Standard High German, standardized varieties of German
- Shua language (ISO 639-3:shg)

== Places in the United States ==
- Sacred Heart-Griffin High School, Springfield, Illinois
- Self Help Graphics & Art, an arts center in east Los Angeles
- Shungnak Airport, Alaska (IATA:SHG)

== Science and technology ==
- Samoyed hereditary glomerulopathy, a disease in dogs
- Scandinavian Hunter-Gatherer, an archaeogenetic lineage
- Second-harmonic generation, in optical physics
- Segmented Hyper Graphics, a computer file format
- SHG Black Point FS 1003/FS 2000, a 1982 German gaming console

== Other uses ==
- Self-help group (finance), a union of workers for financial support
- Sweden Hockey Games, an ice hockey tournament

== See also ==
- SGH (disambiguation)
