= List of help authoring tools =

This page is a list of help authoring tools, organized by operating system.

== Mac ==
Name	Author	License	Remarks
Help Crafter	Putercraft LLC	Apple App Store	none

== Windows ==
Name	Author	License	Remarks
Adobe RoboHelp	Adobe Systems	Proprietary	none
HelpSmith	Divcom Software	Proprietary	none
MadCap Flare	MadCap Software	Proprietary	none
Help & Manual	EC Software	Proprietary	none
HelpNDoc	IBE-Software	Proprietary	Free and Paid app
Sandcastle	Microsoft Corporation	MS Public	none

== Cross-platform ==
Name	Author	License	Remarks
DocBook	OASIS		
Kindle Direct Publishing	Amazon.com		
AsciiDoc	Stuart Rackham	GNU GPL	Open-source software
