= Microsoft Reader =

E-book software

Microsoft Reader (E-book app)
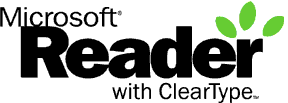
- Developer: Microsoft
- Release: August 2000; 26 years ago
- Final release: 2.1.1 (Windows 98, NT 4.0, 2000, Me, XP) 2.6.1 (Windows XP Tablet PC Edition, Windows Vista (with Origami Experience Pack or Touch Pack)); 2.4.2 (Windows Mobile 6)
- Operating system: Windows
- Type: E-book reader
- License: Proprietary freeware

Microsoft Reader (Document app)
- Developer: Microsoft
- Release: October 2012; 14 years ago
- Operating system: Windows (8/8.1/10), Windows 10 Mobile
- Type: Document viewer
- License: Proprietary freeware

Microsoft Reader is a discontinued Microsoft application for reading e-books, first released in August 2000, that used its own .LIT format. It was available for Windows computers and Pocket PC PDAs. The name was also used later for an unrelated application for reading PDF and XPS files, first released with Windows 8 – this app was discontinued in 2018.

== E-book Reader ==
Microsoft Reader file format
- Filename extension: .lit
- Developed by: Microsoft
- Initial release: August 2000; 26 years ago
- Latest release: 2.4.1; August 2012; 14 years ago
- Extended from: .chm
- Standard: No

The e-book reader was available for download from Microsoft as a free application for computers running Windows and on PDAs running Pocket PC, where it has been built into the ROM since Windows CE 3.0. Microsoft Reader was compatible with Windows Mobile, but was not supported on newer Windows Phone 7 devices.

Microsoft Reader displays books in the .LIT (shortened from "literature") format, an extension of the Microsoft Compressed HTML Help format to include DRM. These e-books can be purchased and downloaded from online stores.

The notable features of Microsoft Reader are ClearType for increased readability on small screens, highlighting and doodling designed for quick note-taking, text notes, and searching. The PC version also has an optional plug-in for text-to-speech, enabling books to be read out loud.

Companies such as Barnes & Noble and Amazon.com partnered with Microsoft to provide books in the format when released in 2000.

In August 2011, Microsoft announced they were discontinuing both Microsoft Reader and the use of the .lit format for ebooks at the end of August 2012, and ending sales of the format on November 8, 2011.

=== Compatibility ===
Operating systems	Latest version	Release date
Windows 95	1.5	2000-08-08
Windows NT 4.0, 98, 2000, Me	2.1.1	2003-06-26
Windows XP, 2003, Vista (with Origami Experience Pack or Touch Pack), Home Server, 2008	2.6.1	2007-07-10
Pocket PC 2000	1.0 (in ROM)	2000-04-19
Pocket PC 2002	2.4	2005-03-24
Windows Mobile 2003, 2003 SE, 5.0	2.4.1	2005-11-23
Windows Mobile 6.0, 6.1	2.4.2	2009-09-10

=== Copy protection ===
Books accessible by Reader can be protected, or unprotected, only allowing access to protected books if the user has activated the software. This can be accomplished by registering using their Passport account. Only six Reader installations can be activated per account, after which, Microsoft requires the user to request further activations.

=== Creating .LIT files ===
Read in Microsoft Reader is an add-on, available from Microsoft, that can be used with Microsoft Word (versions 2000, 2002 and 2003) to create .LIT extension e-books. This software is not fully compatible with Office 2007.

=== Version history ===
==== Desktop ====
Version	Operating systems	Release date	Major changes
1.5	Windows 95, NT 4, 98, 2000, Me	2000-08-08	Initial version for desktops
2.0	Windows NT 4, 98, 2000, Me, XP	2001-10-03	Major overhaul Supports premium eBooks
2.5	Windows XP	2002-06-25	Support for Tablet PC; Pen and Ink features
2.1.1	Windows NT 4, 98, 2000, Me, XP	2003-06-26	Security update
2.6	Windows XP Tablet PC Edition, Vista Ultimate Edition (with Origami Experience Pack or Touch Pack)	2007-07-09	Audible support for newer audio formats Security and performance updates

==== Pocket PC ====
Version	Operating systems	Release date	Major changes
1.0	Windows Mobile 2000	2000-04-19	Initial version for Pocket PCs.
2.0	Windows Mobile 2002	2001-10-03	Compatible with Windows Mobile 2002; Major overhaul Supports premium eBooks
2.2.1	Windows Mobile 2002, 2003	N/A	
2.2.2	Windows Mobile 2002, 2003	2003	Compatible with Windows Mobile 2003
2.2.3	Windows Mobile 2002, 2003	2004-02-04	Fixes activation problems
2.3	Windows Mobile 2002, 2003, 2003 SE	2004-07-13	Compatible with Windows Mobile 2003 SE
2.4	Windows Mobile 2002, 2003, 2003 SE	2005-03-24	
2.4.1	Windows Mobile 2003, 2003 SE, 5, 6.0	2005-11-23	Compatible with Windows Mobile 5 and 6
2.4.2	Windows Mobile 2003, 2003 SE, 5, 6.0, 6.1	2009-09-10	Compatible with Windows Mobile 6.1

==== Read in Microsoft Reader ====
Version	Operating systems	Release date	Major changes
1.1	Windows NT 4, 98, 2000, Me, XP	2001-09-04	Initial version with support for Word 2000, 2002
1.1.3	Windows NT 4, 98, 2000, Me, XP, 2003, Vista, Home Server, 2008	2006-02-21	Conversion support for Word 2003. Supports Word 2000, 2002, 2003. Incompatible with Office 2007

==== Software Development Kit ====
Version	Operating systems	Release date	Major changes
1.5	Windows NT 4, 98, 2000, Me, XP, 2003, Vista, Home Server, 2008	2001-10-04	Initial version

==== Text to Speech ====
Version	Operating systems	Release date	Major changes
1.0	Windows NT 4, 98, 2000, Me, XP, 2003, Home Server	2005-05-19	Initial version

=== Third party ===
Notable third-party apps and tools to convert and read MS .LIT format on various devices include:

- Calibre; an open source e-book library manager that runs on many environments; it can convert .LIT format files
- Lexcycle Stanza (discontinued); a freeware program for reading eBooks; can read .LIT format, supports iOS.

== Document viewer ==
In 2012, Microsoft released a Microsoft Reader Metro-style app with Windows 8 for reading documents in PDF, XPS and TIFF formats. Reader was included in Windows 8.1 and was a free download from the Windows Store for Windows 10. Support for Windows 10 Mobile ended in 2016 in favor of opening PDF documents (and ePub e-books) within the Microsoft Edge Legacy browser. Microsoft discontinued the application in February 2018, as PDF reading functionality on PCs was moved to Edge Legacy, and subsequently to Chromium-based Edge.
