= Adobe Bridge =

Digital file manager

- Adobe Bridge 2025 running on macOS Sequoia
- Developer: Adobe Inc.
- Release: April 4, 2005; 21 years ago
- Stable release: 2026 (16.0.7) / September 11, 2026; 2 days ago
- Operating system: Windows 10 (64-bit) 21H2 or later; macOS 12 or later
- Platform: x64, ARM64
- Type: Digital asset management
- License: Freeware
- Website: adobe.com/products/bridge.html

Adobe Bridge is a free digital asset management app made by Adobe Inc. and first released with Adobe Creative Suite 2. It is a mandatory component of Adobe Creative Suite, Adobe eLearning Suite, Adobe Technical Communication Suite and Adobe Photoshop CS2 through CS6. Starting with Creative Cloud, however, it has become an optional component downloaded via Creative Cloud subscription.

== Details ==
Adobe Bridge is often used to organize files by renaming a group of them at once, assigning colored labels or star ratings assigned to files from the respective Adobe software suite, edit embedded or associated XMP and IPTC Information Interchange Model metadata, or sort or categorize them based on their metadata. It can use these options through different versions of a file that is part of an Adobe Version Cue project. However, it lacks the photo editing functions of Adobe Photoshop Lightroom, which are carried out by the Camera Raw plugin, coming with Adobe Photoshop. Image files can be shown in different sized thumbnails, slide shows or lists. Each folder, which can be bookmarked, has a cache file for speeding up rendering time of images when viewing a thumbnail. The cache can be in one central location or in individual folders.

Adobe Bridge can be invoked from within all components of Creative Suite except Adobe Acrobat.

Coupled with Adobe Photoshop, Bridge can execute Photoshop's compatible automation plug-ins, scripts and Adobe Camera Raw filters on a group of images. A plugin for Photoshop called Mini Bridge adds a small file browser to Photoshop, although Mini Bridge can be used only if Adobe Bridge is running in the background.

Adobe Bridge is customizable using JavaScript. The Bridge scripting guide is available online as well as in paperback format.

Adobe Bridge initially allowed for access to Adobe Stock Photos, an online collection of stock photography images drawn from well-known stock photo houses. The service was discontinued on April 1, 2008 and reactivated in 2015 by the Fotolia microstock-site acquisition.

Currently, the minimum system requirements are Windows 10 (version 21H2) or MacOS 12 Monterey.

== Version history ==
Developer	Date	Icon	Version	Major features added
Adobe	April 2005		CS2 (1.0)	First version of Bridge, included with Creative Suite 2 and Creative Suite Production Studio.
Adobe	March 2007		CS3 (2.0)	New Filter panel, customisable workspace, image stacking, and more.
Adobe	September 2008		CS4 (3.0)	
Adobe	April 2010		CS5 (4.0)	
Adobe	April 2011		CS5.5 (4.5)	
Adobe	May 2012		CS6 (5.0)	
Adobe	June 17, 2013	Adobe Bridge CC 2013-2014	CC	
Adobe	June 18, 2014	Adobe Bridge CC 2013-2014	CC 2014	
Adobe	June 15, 2015		CC 2015 (6.3)	
Adobe	November 2, 2016		CC 2017 (7.0)	Adobe Stock improvements
Adobe	October 18, 2017		CC 2018 (8.0)	Improved scrolling performance; Added support for CEP Extensions - Added Output workspace
Adobe	October 15, 2018		CC (9.0)	
Adobe	November 2019		CC (10.0)	Transparency support for PSDs; Replaced OpenGL APIs with Metal APIs for macOS - Asset conversion using the Export panel
Adobe	June 2020		CC (10.1)	
Adobe	October 2020		CC (11.0)	
Adobe	October 2021		CC (12.0)	
Adobe	October 2022		CC (13.0)	
Adobe	September 2023		CC (14.0)	Keyboard Shortcut Customization; -Multi Window -Compress/Extract files for Various asset types -Place Asset Files from Bridge to Adobe Substance 3D Stager

== Supported file formats ==
The table below contains the supported file formats that can be opened or accessed in Adobe Bridge.

File Format	Definition
.WORKSPACE	Adobe Bridge Workspace File
.ABDATA	Adobe Bridge Data File
.ADOBEBRIDGE	Adobe Bridge URL File
.BC	Adobe Bridge Cache File
.BCM	Adobe Bridge Cache File
.BCT	Adobe Bridge Thumbnail Cache File
.BRIDGECACHE	Adobe Bridge Cache Export File
.COLLECTION	Adobe Bridge Collection File
.TB0	Adobe Photoshop Thumbnail Cache File

== See also ==
- Digital asset
- File manager
- File system
