= Adobe Audition =

Digital audio workstation

- Adobe Audition CC, running on OS X El Capitan
- Developer: Adobe Inc.
- Release: August 18, 2003; 23 years ago
- Stable release: 2026 (26.5) / September 10, 2026; 3 days ago
- Operating system: Windows 10 (64-bit) V22H2 or later macOS Monterey (version 12) or later
- Platform: x86-64, ARM64
- Available in: 9 languages
- List of languages *American English (United States) ,* British English (United Kingdom) , *Mandarin Chinese (China) , *French (France) , *German (Germany) , *Italian (Italy) , *Japanese (Japan) , *Korean (South Korea) , *Portuguese (Portugal) , *Spanish (Spain)
- Type: Digital audio workstation
- License: Trialware, Proprietary, term
- Website: adobe.com/audition

Adobe Audition is a digital audio workstation developed by Adobe Inc. featuring both a multitrack, non-destructive mix/edit environment and a destructive-approach waveform editing view.

== Origins ==
Syntrillium Software was founded in the early 1990s by Robert Ellison and David Johnston, both former Microsoft employees. Cool Edit, an audio editing program distributed as crippleware for Windows computers, was among Syntrillium's early offerings beginning in 1995 with the release of Cool Edit 95. By 1999, the program had matured into its final two versions: Cool Edit 2000, for ordinary users, and Cool Edit Pro, for audio editing professionals. Both drew very positive reviews.

Cool Edit Pro introduced the capability to work with multiple tracks as well as other features. Audio processing, however, was done in a destructive manner. (At the time, few computers had sufficient processor power and memory capacity to perform non-destructive operations in real time.) Cool Edit Pro v2 added support for real-time non-destructive processing, and v2.1 added support for surround sound mixing and unlimited simultaneous tracks (up to the limit imposed by the computer hardware). Cool Edit 2000 and Pro also included plugins such as noise reduction and FFT equalization.

From the beginning, consumer and professional versions of Cool Edit supported numerous import/export codecs for various audio file formats. When MP3 became popular, Cool Edit licensed and integrated the original Fraunhofer MP3 encoder. The software had an SDK and supported codec plugins (FLT filters). The developer community wrote a wide range of import/export format plugins to open and save in a number of audio compression formats. Popular audio formats and containers supported by Cool Edit with built-in codecs or plugins included Fraunhofer MP3, LAME MP3, Dolby AC3, DTS, ACM Waveform, PCM waveform, AIFF, AU, CDA, MPEG-1 Audio, MPEG-2 Audio, AAC, HE-AAC, Ogg Vorbis, FLAC, True Audio, WavPack, QuickTime MOV and MP4 (import only), ADPCM, RealMedia, WMA Standard, WMA Professional, WMA Lossless and WMA Multichannel.

Adobe purchased Syntrillium's technology assets, including Cool Edit, in May 2003 for $16.5 million, as well as a large loop library called "Loopology." Adobe then renamed Cool Edit Pro to "Adobe Audition" and terminated Cool Edit 2000.

== Version ==
=== Version 1 ===
Adobe Audition was released on August 18, 2003. It had bug fixes but no new features and was essentially a more polished Cool Edit Pro 2.1 under a different name. Adobe then released Audition v1.5 in May 2004; major improvements over v1 included pitch correction, frequency space editing, a CD project view, basic video editing and integration with Adobe Premiere, as well as several other enhancements.

=== Version 2 ===
Adobe Audition 2 was released on January 17, 2006. With this release, Audition (which the music recording industry had once seen as a value-oriented home studio application, although it has long been used for editing by radio stations) entered the professional digital audio workstation market. The current version included two sections. Multitrack View supported up to 128 digital audio mono or stereo tracks at up to 32-bit resolution. In the track controls section one could select the input and output for each track (the program supported multiple multi-channel sound cards), select "record", "solo", and "mute", and access the effects rack. New features included Audio Stream Input/Output (ASIO) support, VST (Virtual Studio Technology) support, new mastering tools (many provided by iZotope), and a redesigned UI. Adobe also included Audition 2.0 as part of its Adobe Production Studio bundle.

=== Version 3 ===
Adobe Audition 3 was released on November 8, 2007. New features included VSTi (virtual instrument) support, enhanced spectral editing, a redesigned multi-track interface, new effects, and a collection of royalty-free loops.

CS2 activation servers' shutdown: Adobe Audition 3, with some other CS2 products, was released with an official serial number, due to the technical glitch in Adobe's CS2 activation servers (see Creative Suite 1 & 2).

=== Version 4 (CS5.5) ===
Audition 4, also known as Audition CS5.5, was released on April 11, 2011, as part of Adobe Creative Suite. Audition 4 was shipped as part of the Adobe Creative Suite 5.5 Master Collection and Adobe Creative Suite 5.5 Production Premium, replacing the discontinued Adobe Soundbooth. Audition 4 was also made available as a standalone product. Enhanced integration with Adobe Premiere Pro allowed editing of multitrack Premiere projects, and users of third-party software were served by the introduction of OMF- and XML-based import-export functions. Other new features included improved 5.1 multichannel support, new effects (DeHummer, DeEsser, Speech Volume Leveler, and Surround Reverb), a history panel, faster and fully supported real-time FFT analysis, and a new audio engine (more reliable and faster) for non-ASIO devices.

According to Adobe, Audition CS5.5 was rewritten from the ground up to take advantage of parallel/batch processing for performance and make it a platform-agnostic product; this is the first version compatible with Mac OS. Over 15 years' worth of C++ code was analyzed, and many features of the previous version were ported or enhanced. Notable removed features include VSTi support and MIDI sequencing. Many other features from previous Windows versions of Adobe Audition, such as FLT filters, DirectX effects, clip grouping, many effects (Dynamic EQ, Stereo Expander, Echo Chamber, Convolution, Scientific filters, Binaural Auto-Panner, etc.) were removed as the product was rewritten to have identical cross-platform features for Windows and macOS. Some of the features were later restored in Audition CS6 but the wide range of audio codec compression/decoding filters for import/export of various audio file formats were discontinued.

=== Version 5 (CS6) ===
Adobe showed a sneak preview of Audition CS6 in March 2012 highlighting clip grouping and automatic speech alignment (which had its technology previewed in September 2011). Audition CS6 was released on April 23, 2012, as part of both Creative Suite 6 Master Collection and Creative Suite 6 Production Premium. It included faster and more precise editing, real-time clip stretching, automatic speech alignment, EUCON and Mackie control surface support, parameter automation, more powerful pitch correction, HD video playback, new effects, and more features.

=== Version 6 (CC) ===
Adobe Audition 6, also more commonly known as Audition CC, was released on June 17, 2013. It is the first in the Audition line to be part of the Adobe Creative Cloud. Also, Audition CC is now the first 64-bit application in the Audition line. This can provide faster processing time when compared to Audition CS6. New features include sound remover, preview editor, and pitch bender.

== See also ==
- Comparison of multitrack recording software
- Adobe Enhanced Speech
