= Interleaf =

Defunct software company

Interleaf, Inc.
- Industry: Software
- Founded: 1981; 45 years ago in Cambridge, Massachusetts
- Founders: David Boucher; Harry George
- Defunct: 2000; 26 years ago
- Fate: Acquired by Broadvision
- Products: See § Products

Interleaf, Inc. was a company that created computer software products for the technical publishing creation and distribution process. Founded in 1981, its initial product was the first commercial document processor that integrated text and graphics editing, producing WYSIWYG ("what you see is what you get") output at near-typeset quality. It also had early products in the document management, electronic publishing, and Web publishing spaces. Interleaf's "Active Documents" functionality, integrated into its text and graphics editing products in the early 1990s, was the first to give document creators programmatic access (via LISP) to virtually all of the document's elements, structures, and software capabilities.

Broadvision acquired Interleaf in January 2000, and Aurea Software Inc. acquired Broadvision in May 2020.

Interleaf's headquarters was in Cambridge, Massachusetts, US, and later moved to Waltham, Massachusetts.

== History ==
Interleaf was founded by David Boucher and Harry George in 1981. Boucher was chief executive officer from 1981 until 1992; George was chief financial officer. Earlier, both were among the founders of Kurzweil Computer Products. Significant technology came from MIT's Office Automation Group led by Michael Hammer, a member of Interleaf's board of directors; Bahram (Bern) Niamir, who had been in that group, brought many ideas from its Etude system, a pioneering WYSIWYG editor. Other early personnel came from NBI, Inc. and Wang Labs. The company initially produced "turnkey" systems, that is, combinations of hardware and software integrated by the company. It initially ran on workstations from Sun Microsystems and Apollo Computers, but later ported its software to workstations made by Digital Equipment Corporation, HP, IBM and SGI, and later still, to the Apple Macintosh II and the IBM Personal Computer.

Interleaf sold its first products in 1984-5. Inspired by the Xerox Star and Apple Lisa, TPS (Technical Publishing Software) uniquely enabled authors to write their text and create technical graphics on a computer screen that showed what the page would look like when formatted and printed on a laser printer. This capability was so unusual in 1985 that the company's name referred to the "interleaving" of text and graphics. WYSIWYG editing was also new, as existing typesetting systems were text-based and relied on user markup and batch processing to produce the result. TPS was also noted for its ability to handle the sorts of long documents corporate technical publishing departments routinely created.

Interleaf had its initial public offering (IPO) in June 1986, raising $24.6 million.

In 1990, Interleaf moved from Cambridge to Waltham, MA.

The company was bought by Broadvision in 2000, which renamed its authoring products "Quicksilver". The availability of Quicksilver 3.0 was announced in March 2007. The availability of QuickSilver 3.5 was announced in May 2010. QuickSilver 3.7 was released in July 2014. Quicksilver is currently sold and supported by Aurea Software, Inc.

== Conversion ==
There remain engineering companies and defense contractors that have their archives in the Interleaf/Quicksilver format, however in the 2000s it became increasingly difficult and expensive to maintain documents in that format, thus, established users of Quicksilver and the original Interleaf often seek to convert their documents to another format, usually Microsoft Word because of its ubiquity in large corporations.

Because of the aging of the Interleaf/Quicksilver code, by the early 2000s there were few technical options to convert Interleaf/Quicksilver documents. One option is to retype the entire document manually. This is only cost effective using labor in countries with low labor costs like China and the Philippines, however, in any case, a manual conversion process has high risks of human contamination of data.

Based on a web search, there appear to have been few software based, programmatic conversion services for Interleaf/Quicksilver. By 2023, we found only one such service in the marketplace: ZANDAR Corporation's TagWrite, that claims to have the ability to make precise, programmatic conversion of Interleaf/Quicksilver entirely in computer memory without human intervention.

== Products ==
=== TPS ===
TPS (later renamed to "Interleaf 5," up through "Interleaf 7") was an integrated, networked text-and-graphics document creation system initially designed for technical publishing departments. Versions after its first release in 1984 added instantaneous updating of page numbering and reference numbers through multi-chapter and multi-volumes sets, increased graphics capabilities, automatic index and table of content generation, hyphenation, equations, "microdocuments" that recursively allowed fully functional whole document elements to be embedded in any document, and the ability to program any element of a document (a capability the company called "Active Documents"). Interleaf software was available in many languages including Japanese text layout.

TPS was a structured document editor. That is, it internally treated a document as a set of element classes, each with its own set of properties. Classes might include common document elements such as a body, paragraphs, titles, subheadings, captions, etc. Authors were free to create any set of elements and save them as a reusable template. The properties of a class — its font size, for example — could be changed and automatically applied to every instance of that class. If this caused a change in pagination — increasing the font size could change where the page breaks were — the software would update the screen quickly enough for the author to continue typing, including altering all of the cross-references that the author may have inserted; this WYSIWYG capability was a competitive advantage for the company. The structured nature of the documents also enabled TPS to provide conditional document assembly, a feature that enabled users to "tag" document elements with metadata about them, and then automatically assemble versions of the document based upon those tags. For example, an aircraft manufacturer might tag paragraphs with the model number of the planes to which they applied and then assemble versions of the documentation specific to each model.

The fact that it created structured documents enabled Interleaf to add its Active Document capabilities in the early 1990s. Just as JavaScript enables contemporary software developers to add functionality and "intelligence" to Web documents, Interleaf used LISP to enable document authors and engineers to enhance its authoring electronic publishing systems. Any document element could be given new "methods" (capabilities), and could respond to changes in the content or structure of the document itself. Typical applications included documents that automatically generated and updated charts based upon data expressed in the document, pages that altered themselves based on data accessed from databases or other sources, and systems that dynamically created pages to guide users through complex processes such as filling out insurance forms.

=== Interleaf Relational Document Manager (RDM) ===
RDM was an early document management product, acquired in the late 1980s and then integrated with Interleaf's other products. RDM used a relational database management system to manage the elements of complex document sets, including their versions. Team of authors and editors would "check in" their documents when done with a work session, and begin a new session by "checking them out." In so doing, RDM would ensure that the authors were working on the most current version of the document, even if another author had worked on it in the interim.

=== Interleaf WorldView ===
Interleaf Worldview's core functionality is familiar to users of Adobe Acrobat Reader and other Portable Document Format (PDF) viewers, although Worldview preceded it by a year Worldview allowed document sets created with Interleaf's technical publishing tools to be viewed on workstations, Macintoshes, and PCs, retaining page fidelity, and including hyperlinks among the pages

=== Interleaf WorldView Press ===
Worldview Press prepared documents for online viewing via Worldview. It imported documents created not only with Interleaf's systems but by the other major document creation and graphic systems of the time, including Microsoft Word, PostScript, TIFF and SGML. Using Interleaf's technical publishing system's ability to reformat documents rapidly, Worldview Press enabled the creation of documents formatted for particular delivery vehicles. For example, the same documents could be formatted for reading on a small laptop screen or for a large workstation's monitor. WorldView Press, developed in Lisp, was conceived and implemented by Jim Giza.

=== Interleaf Cyberleaf ===
As the World Wide Web became increasingly adopted as the preferred mechanism for distributing electronic documents, Interleaf added Cyberleaf, a version of the WorldView Press that produced HTML documents. Bill O'Donnell was the designer and developer of Cyberleaf. Later versions were worked on by Brenda White.

== Competitors ==
In the technical authoring and publishing area, Framemaker and Ventura Publisher became major competitors.

In the document management area, Interleaf competed with Documentum.

In the electronic distribution area, Adobe Acrobat, launched after Interleaf Worldview, became the dominant software.
