= Broadvision =

American technology company

BroadVision, Inc.
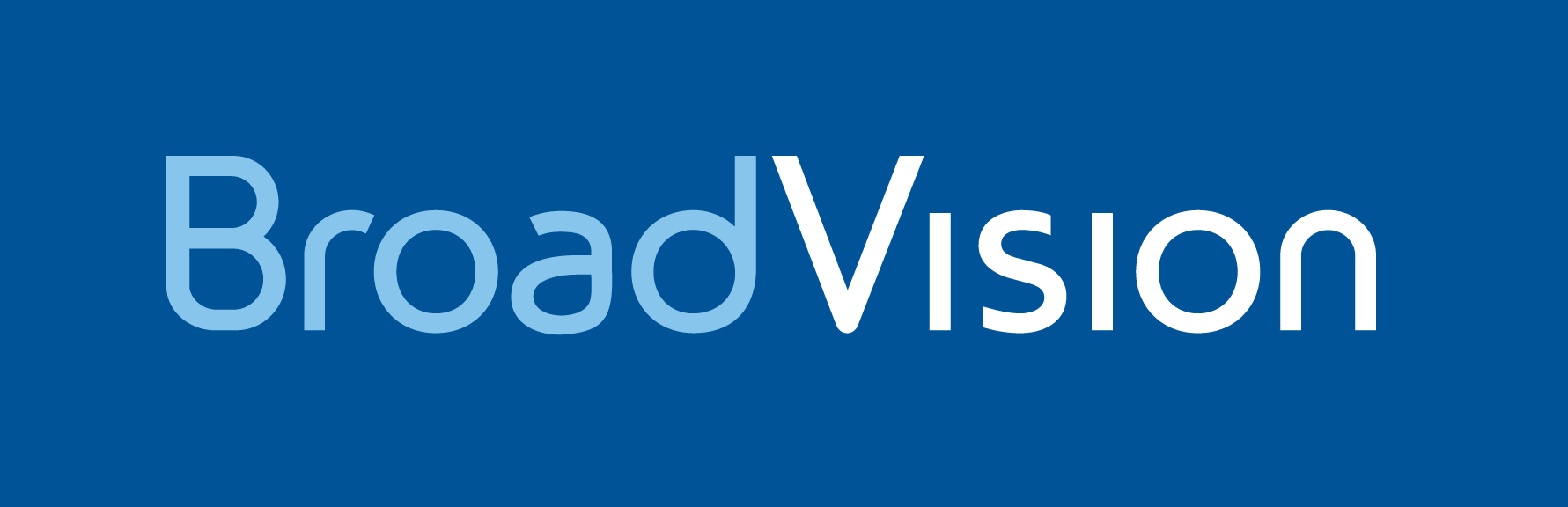
- Industry: Technology; Internet Software and Services
- Founded: 1993; 33 years ago
- Founder: Pehong Chen
- Headquarters: Redwood City, California, United States
- Key people: Pehong Chen (chairman, president, and CEO)Peter Chu (CFO and VP of Strategy & Products); Yuk Chan (VP of Engineering)
- Revenue: $ 15.60M (Dec 31, 2013)
- Owner: Aurea Software, Inc. (May 2020-)
- Website: broadvision.com

BroadVision, Inc. is an international software vendor of self-service web applications for enterprise social software, electronic commerce, enterprise portals, and customer relationship management. The company provides applications to businesses. In addition, the company provides toolkit, framework, library for extending its products and services. The company is headquartered in Redwood City, California, United States. It was founded on May 13, 1993, by Pehong Chen, and its initial public offering took place in 1996.

BroadVision was a pioneer in eCommerce in the 1990s, and its stock was highly valued during the dot-com bubble, reaching a split-adjusted high of over $20,000 per share in March 2000. After the bubble burst, Broadvision struggled, and its stock was delisted from the Nasdaq for a period. One of BroadVision's most famous clients during the dot com bubble was pets.com. Customers include Asda, City of Chicago, Club Med, Gwinnett County, ING Group, Long's Drugs, Pillsbury Winthrop, Rand McNally, RS Components, State of California, Indian Railways, Highmark Insurance, Express Scripts, Printmountain and Equire (Links of london, Hamleys).

== History ==
BroadVision, Inc. was set up in 1993. In 1995 its ecommerce services were introduced to the market and the company became public on Nasdaq in the next year. In 2000, it acquired Interleaf and introduced QuickSilver in the same year. During the next ten years, the company extended its market step by step, introducing Clear, Clearvale (cloud-based services), Clearvale Second Floor Speaker Series, Clearvale PaasPort, and Clearvale Express.

== Products and services ==
Applications of the company include business agility suite, ecommerce agility suite for online shopping, Clearvale, Clear (a human resources (HR) management system), QuickSilver (a document publishing system), Kona framework, and eMerchandising (processing sales data) Clearvale is BroadVision's enterprise social networking platform available under a software as a service model.
