= Segmented Hyper Graphics =

Computer image file format

A Segmented Hyper Graphics (SHG) file is a computer image file format that contains a bitmap and optionally a number of hotspots. This file format was developed for use in WinHelp files, and allowed the user to click on different parts of an image to jump to different topics in the help file. SHG files can still be imported by some help authoring tools and thus can be used to create help files in formats other than WinHelp.

The SHG format is rarely used for help file formats other than WinHelp. Most other help formats use a method based on HTML image maps.

== SHG-enabled software ==
- Microsoft's shed.exe the original application used to create SHG files
- JGsoft's Hotspot Builder , which can create and edit SHG files
- EC Software's Help and Manual , which can import SHG files
- Ulead Photo Explorer 8.5 , , which can be used to view SHG files
