= Adobe RoboHelp =

Help authoring tool for Microsoft Windows

- Developer: Adobe Systems
- Stable release: 2022.5.28 / September 30, 2024; 13 months ago
- Operating system: Windows 10 (64 bit) Version 1903 and later; Windows 11 (64 bit)
- Type: Technical documentation editor
- License: Proprietary software
- Website: adobe.com/robohelp

Adobe RoboHelp is a help authoring tool developed and published by Adobe Inc. for Windows. RoboHelp was created by Gen Kiyooka, and Blue Sky Software released version 1.0 in January 1992.

Blue Sky Software was founded in 1990 and changed its name to eHelp Corporation on 4 April 2000. Macromedia acquired eHelp Corporation on 24 October 2003. Macromedia was, in turn, acquired by Adobe Systems on 3 December 2005. Adobe Systems has developed and released nine successive versions of RoboHelp since 2007.

== Features ==
Adobe RoboHelp can generate help files in the following file formats:

- Adobe AIR
- Adobe PDF
- EclipseHelp
- ePub
- FlashHelp
- FlashHelp Pro
- JavaHelp
- KF8
- Microsoft Compiled HTML Help
- Microsoft WinHelp
- Microsoft Word
- MOBI
- Oracle Help for Java
- WebHelp
- WebHelp Pro
- XHTML
- XML

== Revision history ==
The version numbering systems used by Blue Sky Software/eHelp Corporation, Macromedia, and Adobe Systems induced some head-scratching, especially among longtime RoboHelp users. For example, the first version of RoboHelp released by Adobe Systems in January 2007 was the 14th version of the software, but Adobe Systems decided to continue the numbering convention from Macromedia and thus gave this version the number 6...and dropped the X used in the previous version, RoboHelp X5. This decision caused confusion because Blue Sky Software released RoboHelp 6.0 in 1998. Adobe Systems continued with that numbering system and used versions 7 through 11 for successive versions of RoboHelp released from September 2007 to January 2014. With the introduction of Adobe RoboHelp 2015 in June 2015, Adobe Systems used a new numbering system with the release year instead of a version number and continues to use this convention with successive versions. This new version numbering system has removed any uncertainty about which version is the most recent. The current version, Adobe RoboHelp 2019, is the 22nd version of the software released in RoboHelp's 26-year history.

Version	Release date	Changes
1.0	January 1992	First general availability release.
2.0–12.0	1993–2003	Blue Sky Software/eHelp Corporation released 11 successive versions of RoboHelp between 1993 and 2003 that started with version 2.0 and ended with version X4, which was released on 27 May 2003. RoboHelp X4 was the 12th version of the software.
13.0	27 January 2004	Three months after Macromedia acquired eHelp Corporation, Macromedia released RoboHelp X5 on 27 January 2004. Macromedia decided to continue the version numbering convention from the previous version, though RoboHelp X5 was the 13th version of the software.
14.0	17 January 2007	Adobe Systems released Adobe RoboHelp 6, which was the 14th version of the software, on 17 January 2007. Enhancements include: Command-line compilation; User-defined variables; Build-tag usage reports; Microsoft Word import/export improvements; Integration with Adobe Acrobat Elements
15.0	27 September 2007	Adobe Systems released Adobe RoboHelp 7 on 27 September 2007. RoboHelp 7 came in a standalone version and as part of Adobe Technical Communication Suite 1.0. Enhancements include: Unicode support; Windows Vista and Office 2007 support; More flexible user interface; More refined editor
16.0	20 January 2009	Adobe Systems released Adobe RoboHelp 8 on 20 January 2009. RoboHelp 8 came in a standalone version and as part of Adobe Technical Communication Suite 2.0. Enhancements include: Direct import of HTML or XHTML files; DITA content import; New Styles and Formatting and Resource Manager pods; The new style editor for creating and editing styles; Generation of help projects in Adobe AIR format; Search enhancements; Scripting support; Integration with Adobe Captivate
17.0	11 January 2011	Adobe Systems released Adobe RoboHelp 9 on 11 January 2011. RoboHelp 9 came in a standalone version and as part of Adobe Technical Communication Suite 3.0. Enhancements include: Support of shared and linked resources; Enhanced user defined variables and snippets pods; Automated CSH authoring; Web output preview in multiple browsers
18.0	26 July 2012	Adobe Systems released Adobe RoboHelp 10 on 26 July 2012. RoboHelp 10 came in a standalone version and as part of Adobe Technical Communication Suite 4.0. Enhancements include: Multi-screen HTML5 content; Export to Amazon Kindle (KF8) and Mobipocket (.mobi) file formats; Customizable screen layouts; Integration with Microsoft SharePoint
19.0	14 January 2014	Adobe Systems released Adobe RoboHelp 11 on 14 January 2014. It was available as a standalone product and as part of Adobe Technical Communication Suite 5.0. Enhancements include: Single-click responsive HTML5 publishing; Responsive HTML5 layout editor; Customized headers and footers in printed documentation; Context-sensitive help for mobile apps; Managing shared resources on the cloud; Online and offline help viewers
2015 (20.0)	8 June 2015	Adobe Systems released Adobe RoboHelp 2015 on 8 June 2015. This was the first Adobe-produced version to include the release year instead of the version number. It was available as a standalone product or as part of Adobe Technical Communication Suite 6.0. Enhancements include: Mobile app support; Ribbon user interface; Enhanced search functionality; Dynamic filtering; Responsive layouts and improvements; Right-to-Left (RTL) language support
2017 (21.0)	31 January 2017	Adobe Systems released Adobe RoboHelp 2017 on 31 January 2017. It is available as a standalone product or as part of Adobe Technical Communication Suite (2017 Release). Enhancements include: Two new HTML5 layouts; Search auto-complete functionality within a generated help project file; Ability to add folders to Baggage files; Easy switching between variable views; Creation of expandable thumbnail images in a generated help project for faster loading
2019 (22.0)	22 August 2018	Adobe Systems released Adobe RoboHelp 2019 on 22 August 2018. It is available as a standalone product or as part of Adobe Technical Communication Suite (2019 Release). Enhancements include: Minimalist user interface; Redesigned skin editor; XML source code editor; The ability to delete styles or use only the styles used in an imported Microsoft Word document; Support for SharePoint Online and GIT source controls; Table of Contents (TOC) based output; i.e., whatever is in the TOC goes into the output instead of what is in the entire project; Improved search capabilities in generated help projects
2020 (23.0, internally 15)	15 July 2020	It is available as a standalone product or as part of Adobe Technical Communication Suite (2020 Release). Enhancements include: Microcontent authoring; Cross-reference support; Web-based Online Review (beta); Auto-translate with machine translation; XLIFF-based translation support; Publish to Zendesk; Publish to Salesforce Knowledge; Out-of-the-box integration with chatbots; Frameless layout with top navigation bar; New Frameless output; macOS support

== Other RoboHelp tools ==
- RoboHelp Classic is the classic version of the help authoring tool developed and published by Adobe Inc. for Windows. RoboHelp Classic was first distributed in the Technical Communication Suite version 2019.
- RoboHelp Server (formerly RoboSource Control) provides version control for and deployment of online help systems on a network. The current version of Adobe RoboHelp Server, version 10, was released on 12 April 2016.
- RoboScreenCapture is a screen capture tool that can be used for capturing and editing images.
