= SGH =

SGH may refer to:

- sgh, ISO 639-3 code for the Shughni language
- SGH, IATA airport code for Springfield–Beckley Municipal Airport in Ohio, U.S.
- SGH, a former corporate name of Sunglass Hut
- SGH Warsaw School of Economics, a business school in Poland

== Companies ==
- SGH Limited, an Australian business conglomerate
- Sikorsky Global Helicopters, a former business unit of Sikorsky Aircraft
- Simpson Gumpertz & Heger, an American engineering company
- Smart Global Holdings (renamed Penguin Solutions), parent company of Stratus Technologies

== Hospitals ==
- Scarborough Grace Hospital, a facility in Toronto, Canada
- Seattle Grace Hospital, a fictional facility in the television series Grey's Anatomy
- Sharp Grossmont Hospital, a facility in La Mesa, California, U.S.
- Singapore General Hospital, a facility in Outram, Singapore
- Southampton General Hospital, a large teaching hospital in Southampton, Hampshire, England
- Southern General Hospital, a defunct facility in Glasgow, Scotland

== Other uses ==
- Slow-growing hierarchy, a method to describe slow-growing functions

== See also ==
- SHG (disambiguation)
