= Adobe Captivate =

Authoring tool used for creating eLearning content

- Developer: Adobe Inc.
- Stable release: 12.3 / 2 April 2024; 2 years ago
- Operating system: Microsoft Windows, Mac OS X
- Type: eLearning and screencasting
- License: Commercial
- Website: adobe.com/captivate

Adobe Captivate is an authoring tool that is used for creating eLearning content such as software demonstrations, software simulations, branched scenarios, and randomized quizzes in HTML5 format.

For software simulations, Captivate can use left or right mouse clicks, key presses and rollover images.

It can also be used to create screencasts, and to convert Microsoft PowerPoint presentations to HTML5 format, and use SCORM for learner tracking.

== History ==
While the product started out as a pure screen recording utility known as Flashcam (Nexus Concepts 2002), it evolved into an E-learning authoring tool after San Diego–based eHelp Corporation acquired Flashcam and released it as RoboDemo. Eventually, software firm Macromedia acquired eHelp to gain RoboDemo. Shortly before Adobe Systems acquired Macromedia, they changed the name of the product to Captivate.

It used to support Shockwave Flash (.swf, a.k.a. ‘Small Web Format’).

== Versions ==
- RoboDemo 2 (May 2002 by eHelp Corporation) First version with major FlashCam bug fixes (therefore, it was called version "2").
- RoboDemo 3 (Fall 2002 by eHelp Corporation) New features included Powerpoint and AVI import, interactive text entry boxes, interactive click boxes, JavaScript options, and scoring.
- RoboDemo 4 and eLearning Edition (Spring 2003 by eHelp Corporation) New features included AutoText Captions, Animated Text Effects, PowerPoint style interface, publish as email attachment, customize capture key, SCORM, Quiz question slides, support for Questionmark Perception.
- RoboDemo 5 and eLearning Edition (Fall 2003 by eHelp Corporation) New features included tighter integration with Flash via FLA and SWF import, full-motion (real-time) recording, SCORM 1.2., video import, multiple copy/paste, undo, shortcut controls, grid, alignment toolbar, filmstrip view, background audio, animated highlighters, and project resize.
- Macromedia Captivate (October 2004) New features included timeline, audio editing, demonstration and simulation recording modes, customizable quiz questions, export to Flash MX 2004, smart full motion recording, 508 compliance, SCORM 2004, and Breeze integration.
- Adobe Captivate 2 (October 2006) New features included branching view, simulation wizard, library, interaction dialog, zoom, skins and menus, Flash Video (FLV) support, export to Flash 8, step-by-step documentation output, customization options, and PENS.
- Adobe Captivate 3 (July 2007) New features included multimode recording, automatic rerecording, XML export/import (XLIFF) for localization, find and replace, audio recording with preview, randomized quizzes, answer shuffle, new question types (sequence/hotspot), PPT import with animations, rollover slidelet, and slide transition effects. This version has an Adobe Captivate logo preloader added to the beginning of all simulations, but this can be changed to a generic preloader. It would eventually be included in the Adobe Technical Communication Suite.
- Adobe Captivate 4 (Jan 2009) New features included SWF commenting, professional project templates, customizable widgets, roundtrip PowerPoint workflow, table of contents and aggregator, text-to-speech functionality, variables and advanced actions, expanded output options, Adobe Photoshop layer support. This version has features for collaboration, extends Adobe Captivate and interacts with other Adobe products like Bridge, Soundbooth, Photoshop, Adobe Device Central, etc. This version of Adobe Captivate is also part of the new Adobe eLearning Suite.
- Adobe Captivate 5 (May 2010) Unlike previous versions that were derivative of Captivate 2 and carried over notable bugs and technological limitations, Captivate 5 was written from scratch. Features include a new GUI similar to other Adobe CS family products, built-in animation effects, extended Microsoft PowerPoint support, extended video embedding and control (it functions similarly to audio in older versions), master slides andobject styles. Developers are able to publish their content to Acrobat.com and use it as a quasi-Learning management system. Adobe Captivate 5 is available separately or as part of Adobe eLearning Suite 2 for the first time for Mac & Windows.
- Adobe Captivate 5.5 (May 2011) New features include gradients, shadows, and object rotation, enhanced quiz/assessment templates, MP4 output option, YouTube publishing option, pay-as-you go subscription licensing option. Available as a stand-alone product or as part of the Adobe eLearning Suite 2.5 bundle.
- Adobe Captivate 6.0 (June 2012) Interactions (pre-built widgets), actors ( pre-built images), themes and HTML 5 support.
- Adobe Captivate 7.0 (June 2013) Wide range of drag-and-drop components such as games, quizzes, and learning modules. HTML5 conversion for Microsoft PowerPoint projects. Newly bundled MathMagic equation editor for both Mac OS X and Windows versions. Enhanced accessibility support. Interactions library.
- Adobe Captivate 8 (May 2014)
- Adobe Captivate 9 (August 2015) Adobe Captivate 9 adds new features including multi state objects, improved effects and motion paths, creating a content draft on an iOS device, and publishing to the new Adobe LMS known as Captivate Prime which was later rebranded as Adobe Learning Manager. Adds the integration of eLearning Brothers Templates.
- Adobe Captivate (2017 release) (April 2017) The 2017 release of Adobe Captivate adds new features including improvements in responsive design through the use of Fluid Boxes and text scaling, the ability to save legacy non-responsive projects as responsive, integration of Adobe's Typekit to increase the range of fonts available to users, and the ability to customize closed captioning.
- Adobe Captivate (2019 release) (August 2018) The 2019 release of Adobe Captivate adds new features including creating Virtual Reality (VR) projects for immersive eLearning, creating interactive videos for your demos, enhancements to Fluid Boxes, Live Device Previews for your VR projects and responsive courses, smart video recording that includes your webcam feed, and converting your PowerPoint presentations to responsive projects.
- Adobe Captivate - subscription only as of February 2022, the perpetual licenses are not supported anymore, and only a subscription version can be purchased. Of course, Flash files aren't supported anymore, due to its sunset.

== File formats ==
The table below contains some of the supported file formats that can be opened or accessed in Adobe Captivate.

| File format | Extension |
|---|---|
| Adobe Animate Animation | FLA |
| Adobe Language File | ZDCT |
| Audio Video Interleave File | AVI |
| Captivate Aggregate File | AGGR |
| Captivate Commentable SWF File | CREV |
| Captivate Design Template | CPDT |
| Captivate Preferences File | CPR |
| Captivate Project File | CPTX |
| Captivate 12 Project File | CPT |
| Captivate Project Template File | CPTL |
| Captivate Shared Action File | CPAA |
| Captivate Source File | CP |
| Captivate Storyboard Project | CPDX |
| Captivate Styles File | CPS |
| Captivate Theme File | CPTM |
| Captivate Video Composition | CPVC |
| Captivate Widget File | WDGT |
| Flash Video File | FLV |
| Hypertext Markup Language File | HTM, HTML |
| QT Meta Language File | QML |
| Shockwave Flash Movie | SWF |

== See also ==
- Comparison of screencasting software
