= Online help =

Information delivered via computer software

Online help is a form of user assistance that provides topic-oriented, procedural or reference information designed to assist in using a software application, web application or operating system. Online help linked to the application's state (what the user is doing) is called context-sensitive help.

The help information can be created using help authoring tools or component content management systems and can be delivered in a wide variety of proprietary and open-standard formats. Help of this kind has largely replaced printed documentation.

Interactive help can also be provided via virtual assistants and Chatbot systems.

== Microsoft help platforms ==
Microsoft develops platforms for delivering help systems for the Microsoft Windows operating system.

Platform name	Description
Microsoft QuickHelp	Ralph Walden joined Microsoft in 1987 and wrote an online help system for MS-DOS and OS/2 called QuickHelp.
WinHelp (.hlp)	Released in 1990 and based on the Rich Text Format, this was the industry standard for Windows 3.0 and Windows 95/NT. The popular Windows Help program (WinHlp32.exe) was included with all Windows operating systems from Windows 3.0 until the Windows XP operating system. However, the help engine is not included with Windows Vista and is only available as a download.
help command	Introduced in 1991 as part of MS-DOS 5.x.
Microsoft Compiled HTML Help (.chm)	Released alongside Internet Explorer 4 in 1997, it was based on HTML and other data such as images and JavaScript. In 2006, it was available from Microsoft as HTML Help 1.4.
Windows Help and Support	A deprecated help system from Windows Me until Windows 8.1.
Microsoft Help 2 (.hxs)	In 2001, Microsoft announced plans for a wide release of HTML Help 2.0, which came to be called Microsoft Help 2. This platform was developed by Microsoft and shipped in 2002 as the help format for Visual Studio .NET, MSDN Library and TechNet products, but Microsoft announced it had cancelled plans to make the format publicly available. Microsoft Help 2 was also used as the help format in Office 2007.
AP Help 1.0 (.h1s)	Assistance Platform Help is based on Microsoft Assistance Markup Language. It is the format developed for and shipped with Windows Vista. It will not be made publicly available as an authoring platform for other software vendors, but will be used by Microsoft, OEMs and certain corporate users. Version 2.0 of the Assistance Platform Help engine is currently on hold

== Other platforms ==
Platform name	Description
HelpConsole (local HTML files or web-based)	IIS based system, with a standard navigation tree and content area, viewable with a web browser, supports JS, Flash (now deprecated), HTML5, Embedded presentations etc., Since it is web-based, it works on Windows, Linux, and virtually all other Operating Systems.
AmigaGuide (.guide)	The official hypertext document file format designed for the Amiga.
Apple Help (.HELP)	Apple Computer's proprietary help platform for the Mac OS 8.5+ operating system.
WebHelp	A cross-platform, uncompiled Help system that can run on most browsers and on most platforms, including Windows, UNIX, Linux, Sun Solaris, and Macintosh.
Sun JavaHelp (.js)	A platform-independent help system written in Java programming language by Sun Microsystems. It runs on almost any platform and browser that supports the Java Runtime Environment (JRE).
Oracle Help	Two formats developed by the Oracle Corporation: Oracle Help for Java (OHJ) and Oracle Help for Web (OHW).
Help library (.HLB)	The official help file format designed for VMS.
DotNetHelp	A new Windows help format, as an alternative to the .chm format, that also supports .NET applications.
Texinfo (also known as the "info")	The official documentation system for the GNU project.
Unix man pages	The standard method used to document (among others) Unix programs and shell commands, System and Library calls, Special files and File formats .
Information Presentation Facility (IPF)	The help system used by IBM's OS/2 system, eComStation and ArcaOS. It is the official documentation system for the fpGUI Toolkit project.
Norton Guides	

== See also ==
- Balloon help
- Darwin Information Typing Architecture
- DocBook
- Frequently Asked Questions
- List of help authoring tools
- Microsoft Assistance Markup Language (Microsoft AML)
- Help desk
