= Adobe Enhanced Speech =

Artificial intelligence software

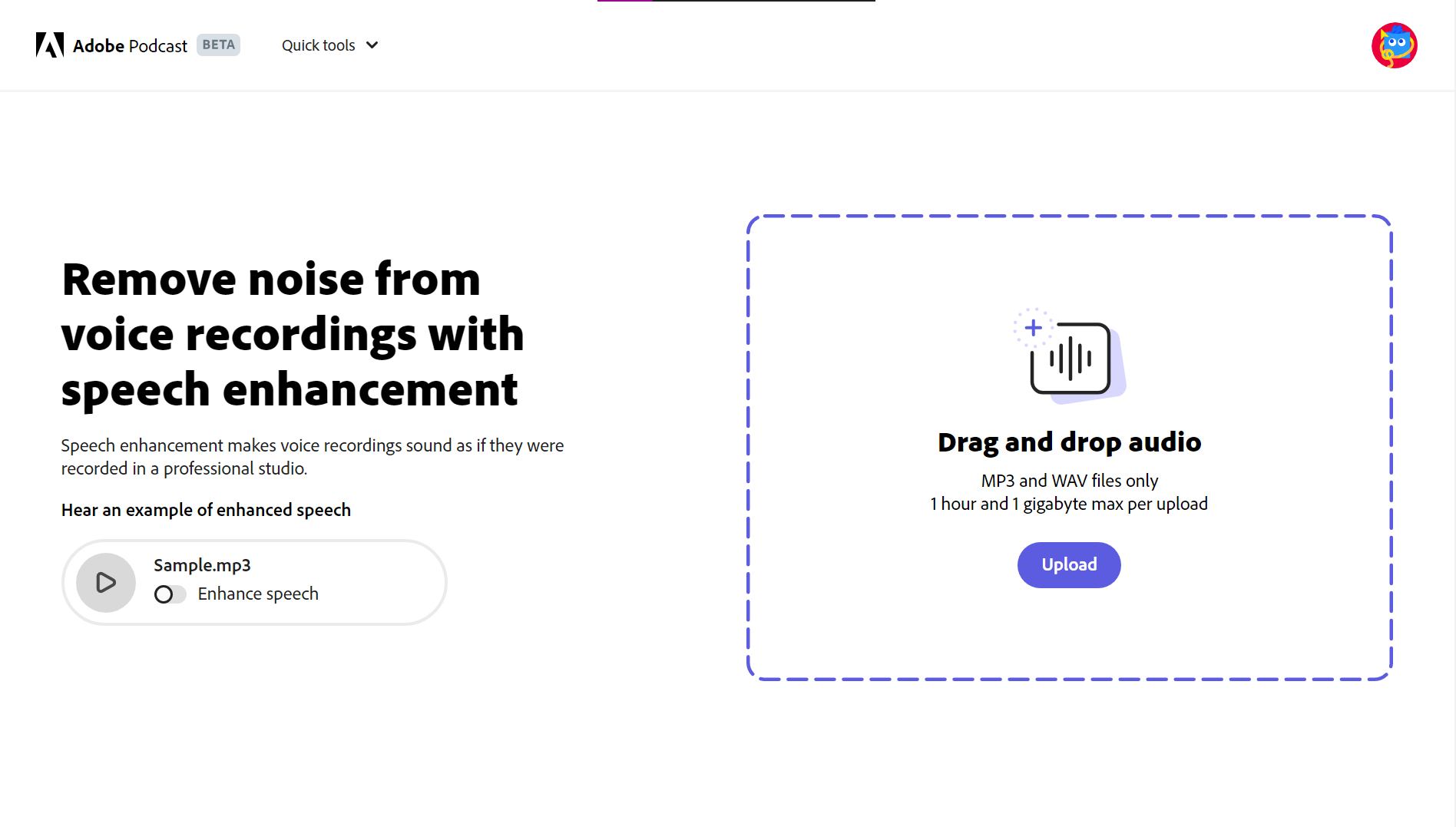
- Website: podcast.adobe.com/enhance
- Registration: Required
- Launched: December 2022

Adobe Enhanced Speech is an online artificial intelligence software tool by Adobe that aims to significantly improve the quality of recorded speech that may be badly muffled, reverberated, full of artifacts, tinny, etc. and convert it to a studio-grade, professional level, regardless of the initial input's clarity. Users may upload mp3 or wav files up to an hour long and a gigabyte in size to the site to convert them relatively quickly, then being free to listen to the converted version, toggle back-and-forth and alternate between it and the original as it plays, and download it.

Currently in beta and free to the public, it has been used in the restoration of old movies and the creation of professional-quality podcasts, narrations, etc. by those without sufficient microphones. In September 2023, Adobe added Enhance Speech to a beta version of its video editing software Premiere Pro, where it runs locally on the user's computer.

Although the model still has some current limitations, such as not being compatible with singing and occasional issues with excessively muffled source audio resulting in a light lisp in the improved version, it is otherwise noted as incredibly effective and efficient in its purpose. Utilizing advanced machine learning algorithms to distinguish between speech and background sounds, it enhances the quality of the speech by filtering out the noise and artifacts, adjusting the pitch and volume levels, and normalizing the audio. This is accomplished by the network having been trained on a large dataset of speech samples from a diverse range of sources and then being fine-tuned to optimize the output.
