= User assistance =

Help for users of a software product

User assistance is a general term for guided assistance to a user of a software product. The phrase incorporates all forms of help available to a user. Assistance can also automatically perform procedures or step users through the procedure, depending on the question that the user asked. The term is broader than online help, and includes procedural and tutorial information.

== What it does ==
User assistance provides information to help a person to interact with software. This can include describing the user interface, but also focuses on how to help the user to best apply the software capabilities to their needs. User assistance can be considered a component of the broader category of user experience.

=== Devices ===
User assistance employs a number of devices including help, wizards, tutorials, printed manuals (and their PDF equivalents), and user interface text. User assistance professionals also contribute to enterprise knowledge bases and content management systems.

=== Skills required ===
Effective user assistance development requires a variety of communication skills. These include writing, editing, task analysis, and subject-matter expert (SME) interviewing. Since the user assistance profession is directly involved with software development, the discipline often requires an understanding of UI design, usability testing, localization, testing, quality assurance, instructional design, scripting or programming, and accessibility.

== Forms ==
=== Instruction manual ===
For information related to this topic, see Instruction manual (computer and video games)

A traditional form of user assistance is a user manual, which is distributed either with the product in paper form or electronically. Typical features of a user manual include installation procedures, a guide to how to use the software, as well as a disclaimer stating the licensing status of the software. Details of a helpline may also be available.

=== Online help ===
For more information on this topic, see Online help

=== Helplines ===
For information related to this topic, see Helpline

== See also ==
- User interface
- Internationalization and localization
