= Microsoft Help 2 =

File format and help system by Microsoft

- Developer: Microsoft
- Operating system: Microsoft Windows
- Predecessor: Microsoft Compiled HTML Help
- Successor: Microsoft Help Viewer
- Type: Help system

Microsoft Help 2.x is a proprietary format for online help files, developed by Microsoft and first released in 2001 as a help system for Visual Studio .NET (2002) and MSDN Library.

Microsoft Help 2.x is the help engine used in Microsoft Visual Studio 2002/2003/2005/2008 and Office 2007 and Office 2010. Help files are made with the Help 2.0 Workshop (VSHIK), a help authoring tool. The default viewer for Help 2.x files is Microsoft Document Explorer, and there are several third-party viewers available such as H2Viewer and Help Explorer Viewer.

Visual Studio 2010 uses a new help engine, Microsoft Help Viewer.

== History ==
- March 2001—Microsoft announced Microsoft Help 2.x at WritersUA (formerly WinWriters) conference.
- January 2003—Microsoft decided not to release Microsoft Help 2 as a general Help platform. Help 2 remained a Visual Studio Help integration tool.
- August 2003—Borland have released C# Builder. Documentation is all in Microsoft Help 2 format and displayed in Microsoft Document Explorer.
- December 2005—Microsoft continues support of Help 2 by releasing the Help Integration Wizard which is Visual Studio 2005 compatible.
- December 2006—Office 2007 is released and uses Microsoft Help 2. The Office help viewer is a custom viewer that can only view Office 2007 help.
- April 2009—Microsoft announced at 2009 WritersUA conference that Microsoft Help System 1.x (development name was MS Help 3) will ship with Visual Studio 2010.

== File format ==
A Microsoft Help 2.x file has a ".hxs" extension. A compressed .HxS help file (help title) is compiled from a set of topic pages written in a subset of HTML (much like its CHM predecessor), a .HxC main project file, an .HxF include file, a .HxT table of contents, a .HxA attribute definition file, and a number of .HxK indexes (keyword Index, NamedURL index, optional associated and context links indexes).

Specifics of the format can be found in an unofficial "ITOLITLS" format specification. An open source "convertlit" tool can be used to decompile the hxs file.

== Applications ==
This format was originally intended only for the help system used by Visual Studio .NET 2002 help, MSDN Library and TechNet, but now it is used in Office 2007, Office 2010 and some IDEs, such as Borland Developer Studio.

An Assistance Platform (AP) help format based on a new XML-based markup language called Microsoft Assistance Markup Language was originally part of the Longhorn project. It introduced a "guided help" (active content wizard, ACW) feature that highlights what parts of the screen to interact with. It can also use this information to automate a task if the user accepts. Microsoft eventually decided against including ACW in Windows Vista. The compiled .H1s help format, along with the HelpPane viewer, remained in Windows Vista and Windows 7. It is similar to H2's Hxs format. A third party "xHelpMarkup" tool for compiling and decompiling exists, but it is only a wrapper around the BDD 2007 apcompnt and apss.dll tools.

== See also ==
- Microsoft WinHelp
- Microsoft Compiled HTML Help
- Microsoft Help Viewer
