= NBI Incorporated =

American computer company

NBI Incorporated was an American computer company based in Boulder, Colorado that offered word processing systems. NBI was known for their office automation systems; dedicated hardware platforms for word processing, document production and records management. NBI stood for Nothing But Initials

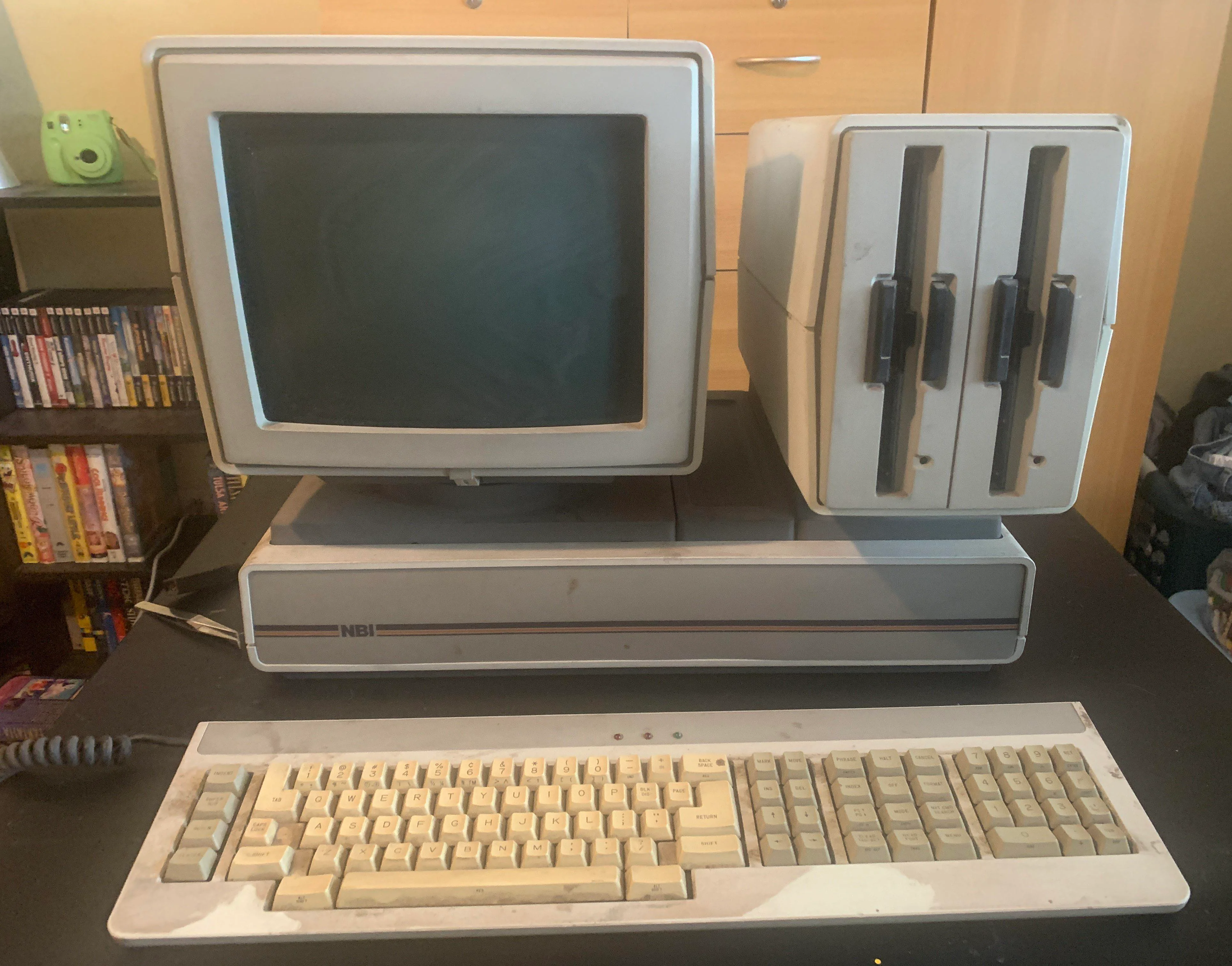
A picture of an NBI System 4000S computer from circa 1985

== Products ==
Products included:

- NBI System 3000
- NBI OASys 4000S
- NBI OASys 4100S and 4100X

=== NBI System 3000 ===
The NBI System 3000 was marketed as a Paperwork Processor, with different software packages targeted at specific use cases. It was sold in two main configurations; Single Station and Dual Station. The Single Station package consisted of master console with a single 8" floppy drive and daisy-wheel printer capable of 55 characters per second. The Dual Station added a slave console, a secondary floppy drive to the master console. In addition to the basic word processing functions of the system, optional hardware and software packages included:

- Wide document and dual-headed printers
- Statistical mathematics package
- Equation typing package
- Asynchronous communications package; a modem capable of communication with a range of different systems at speeds up to 4800 baud.
- Records processing package; a basic non-relational database system capable of storing up to 70 fields per record.

=== NBI OASys 4100 Series ===
The OASys 4100S and 4100X were introduced in May 1984. The 4100S came with single or dual 5¼" floppy disk drives, and the 4100X with a single disk drive and a 10MB hard drive. Both systems were partially IBM-compatible and came with 128KB RAM.

NBI Incorporated entered Chapter 11 bankruptcy protection in 1991 after several loss-making years.
