= Adobe Soundbooth =

Digital audio editor

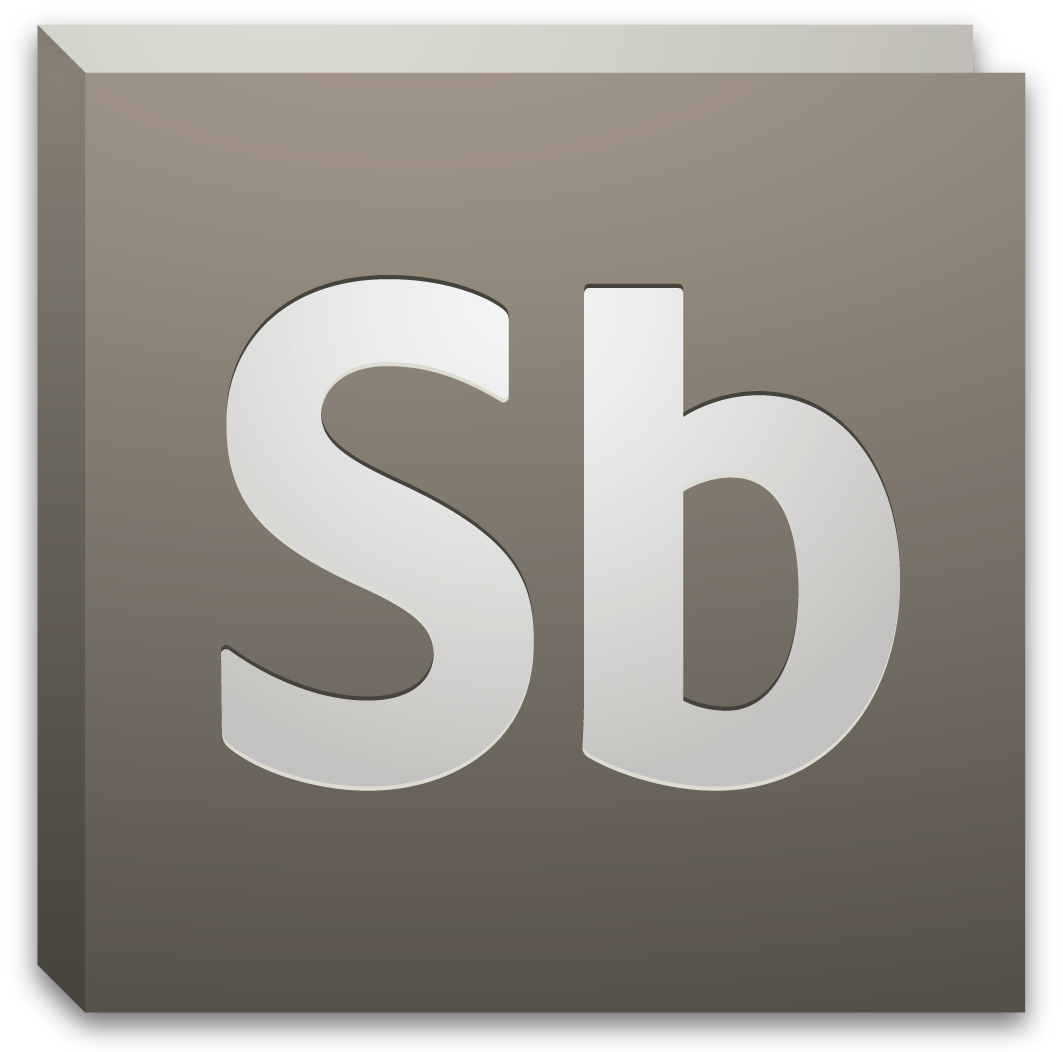

- Adobe Soundbooth CS3 running on Mac OS X
- Developer: Adobe Systems
- Stable release: CS5 v.3.0 / April 12, 2010; 16 years ago
- Operating system: Windows XP SP2 and later Mac OS X 10.4.9 through macOS 10.14.6
- Platform: x86, x86-64
- Type: Digital audio editor
- License: Proprietary
- Website: Adobe Soundbooth Homepage

Soundbooth was a digital audio editor by Adobe Systems Incorporated for Windows XP, Windows Vista, 7 and Mac OS X. Adobe has described it as being "in the spirit of SoundEdit 16 and Cool Edit 2000". Adobe also has a more powerful program called Adobe Audition, which replaced Soundbooth as of Adobe Creative Suite 5.5 Production Premium. Soundbooth, discontinued in 2011, was aimed at creative professionals who do not specialize in audio or people who need a simple editing program and do not require the full features of Adobe Audition. Due to Intel-specific code, Adobe stated that the Mac OS X version would only be available for machines using Intel processors. Soundbooth CS4 was the first version to support 64-bit officially.

== Key features ==
Creation of the Adobe Sound Document allows Adobe Flash to create multi-track audio projects in Soundbooth. Soundbooth also features dynamic linking that allows video sequences from Adobe After Effects and Adobe Premiere Pro to be played in Soundbooth without having to first be rendered, a feature that is expected to save users time.

== Comparing Soundbooth to Audition ==
The major difference between the programs is that Soundbooth uses a task-based interface and Adobe Audition uses a tool-based interface. Another difference is that Soundbooth uses royalty-free scores and sound effects whereas Adobe Audition uses music loops and allows for low latency multi-track recording.

== Criticism ==
Many users have commented on the lack of simple features that were found in programs like Sound Edit 16 and Cool Edit Pro; for example, the ability to create a new file or to "reverse" a sound.

Lack of simple batch processing makes it a chore when needing to simply speed up, clean up (pops or crackles), or apply a pitch change to all of the files in a project. Each chapter, track, or MP3 file must be opened, applied, and saved independently; contrary to customer expectations of features that freeware has provided for many years.

In response, Durin Gleaves (of Adobe) in a post dated 31 March 2007 said, "I agree that Reverse would be an obvious feature, but I'm afraid it's not going to make it into version 1.0 [CS3]. I assure you that several of us are pushing to see it in 2.0 [CS4]."

Creating a new file was added in CS4. While the feature to "reverse" a sound was never implemented.

== Discontinuation ==
Adobe stated on its website that: "Sales of Adobe Soundbooth audio software ended on April 24, 2011. Adobe Audition CS5.5 is replacing Soundbooth in Adobe Creative Suite 5.5 Production Premium software, based on customer requests for a professional audio toolset that integrates with the Adobe workflow. This decision brings the best features from the Adobe family of audio solutions into a single cross-platform package, focusing on the need for high-performance audio in post-production workflows. By combining the power and precise control Adobe Audition users have long appreciated with the more modern interface and streamlined workflow Soundbooth users value, Adobe Audition CS5.5 offers the flexibility and quality of a full-featured audio tool designed for speed and efficiency on both Mac OS and Windows."
