= Ask Foy =

Open helpline run by Auburn University

The Foy Information Desk, or the Foy Information Line, is a telephone and walk-in information service provided by Auburn University and hosted in the new Student Union building. The service has been in continuous operation since it was started in 1953 by the Dean of Students, James E. Foy. At one time, the service was available 24 hours a day, but is now available from 7 am to 11pm Central Standard Time. The Foy Information Desk service was initially designed as a resource for Auburn students who were looking for course information, grades, or campus services, but now accepts calls from the general public. The operators are Auburn University students, and the free service attempts to answer any question within reason asked by a caller or visitor about Auburn University. Auburn's Foy Information Desk service is one of the busiest information lines, receiving around 1000 calls each day.

The service was featured on the Today Show on November 27, 2007.

On October 10, 2014, an employee at the Foy Information Desk received a bomb threat from a caller. The building was evacuated while police searched for explosives, finding none. The call was traced back to a 15-year-old in Tennessee.
