= JavaHelp =

File format and help system for Java software

- Developer(s): Oracle Corporation
- Final release: 2.0.05 / May 2007
- Written in: Java
- Operating system: Cross-platform
- Platform: Java Virtual Machine
- License: GPL
- Website: github.com/javaee/javahelp/

JavaHelp is both an application and a format for online help files that can be displayed by the JavaHelp browser. It is written in Java, and is mainly used in Java applications. It can be used for any application and it does require the overhead of the JRE to load.

The file format is XML.

The GUI uses a tri-pane layout, with a toolbar and menu at the top, navigation pane on the left, and content viewer on the right. The navigation pane includes searching, indexing, and a table of contents.

== License ==
JavaHelp application used to come with the GNU General Public License with Classpath exception

However, since the source code from JavaHelp was put on GitHub for JavaEE, the source code has been re-licensed to the Common Development and Distribution License. However the source code files are still (mistakenly) under the GPLv2 with Classpath exception license
