= Microsoft Compiled HTML Help =

Software help file format by Microsoft

- Filename extension: .chm
- Internet media type: application/vnd.ms-htmlhelp
- Developed by: Microsoft
- Initial release: 1997
- Latest release: 1.4
- Extended to: .lit

Microsoft HTML Help Executable
- Other names: hh.exe
- Developer: Microsoft
- Included with: Microsoft Windows
- Predecessor: Microsoft WinHelp
- Successor: Microsoft Help 2
- Type: Help system

Microsoft Compiled HTML Help (CHM) (Note: An initialism of "Compiled Help Module".) is a Microsoft proprietary online help format, consisting of a collection of HTML pages, an index and other navigation tools. The files are compressed and deployed in a binary format with the extension .CHM. The format was intended to succeed Microsoft WinHelp.

Although the format was designed by Microsoft, it has been successfully reverse-engineered and is now supported by many document viewers.

== History ==
CHM was introduced as the successor to Microsoft WinHelp with the release of Windows 95 OSR 2.5. Within the Windows NT family, the CHM file support is introduced in Windows NT 4.0 and is still supported in Windows 11.

Month	Year	Description
February	1996	Microsoft announces plans to stop development of WinHelp and start development on HTML Help.
August	1997	HTML Help 1.0 (HH 1.0) is released with Internet Explorer 4.
February	1998	HTML Help 1.1a ships with Windows 98.
January	2000	HTML Help 1.3 ships with Windows 2000.
July	2000	HTML Help 1.32 releases with Internet Explorer 5.5 and Windows Me.
October	2001	HTML Help 1.33 releases with Internet Explorer 6 and Windows XP.
March	2001	At the WritersUA (formerly WinWriters) conference, Microsoft announces plans for a new help platform, Help 2, which is also HTML based.
January	2003	Microsoft decides not to release Microsoft Help 2 as a general Help platform.

Microsoft has announced that they do not intend to add any new features to HTML Help.

== File format ==
Help is delivered as a binary file with the .chm extension. It contains a set of HTML files, a hyperlinked table of contents, and an index file. The file format has been reverse-engineered and documentation of it is freely available.

The file starts with bytes "ITSF" (in ASCII), for "Info-Tech Storage Format", which is the internal name given by Microsoft to the generic storage file format used for CHM files.

CHM files support the following features:

- Data compression (using LZX)
- Built-in search engine
- Ability to merge multiple .chm help files
- Extended character support, although it does not fully support Unicode.

The Microsoft Reader's .lit file format is a modification of the HTML Help CHM format. CHM files are sometimes used for e-books.

== Viewers ==
In addition to Microsoft Windows, the following apps support CHM:

Name	Operating system	Website	
Okular	Linux, Unix-like, Windows	okular.kde.org invent.kde.org/graphics/okular	Uses hh.exe on Windows
Calibre	Windows, macOS, Linux	calibre-ebook.com calibre on GitHub	
Sumatra PDF	Windows	www.sumatrapdfreader.org sumatrapdf on GitHub	
GnoCHM	Linux, BSD	GnoCHM on SourceForge	
CHM View	None/Uncompiled	chmviewkit on GitHub	
kchmviewer	Windows, Linux	ulduzsoft.com/kchmviewer/	
KCHM	Linux, BSD, Solaris	KCHM on SourceForge	
CHMPane	Windows, macOS, Linux	CHMPane on SourceForge	
CHMate Neue	iOS, iPadOS, visionOS	CHMate Neue on iTunes	
iChm	iOS, macOS	iChm on iTunes	Discontinued
ChmPlus	iOS, iPadOS, macOS, visionOS	ChmPlus on iTunes	
Chmox	macOS	chmox.sourceforge.net Chmox on SourceForge	
Clearview	macOS	Clearview on iTunes	
DisplayCHM	Linux	linux-apps.com/p/998057	
KOReader	Android, Linux	koreader.rocks Koreader on GitHub	
7-zip	Windows (GUI), MacOS (command-line), Linux (command-line)	www.7-zip.org Ip7z on GitHub	7-zip can show the contents of .chm files as though they are a compressed archive, but does not render the HTML as a help-viewer.

== Creators ==
Microsoft's HTML Help Workshop generates CHM files by instructions stored in an HTML Help project file, which bears a .HHP file name extension and is a specialized form of INI file.

Lazarus and Free Pascal provide a doxygen-like tool for CHM generation and a separate command-line compiler called chmcmd.

== Other utilities ==
The official viewer in Microsoft Windows (hh.exe) can decompile a CHM file. So can Microsoft HTML Help Workshop and 7-Zip. Calibre and arCHMage can convert CHM into another format.

== See also ==
- WinHelp
- Microsoft Help 2
- Comparison of documentation generators
