= Outline of the C sharp programming language =

Programming language

The following outline is provided as an overview of and topical guide to C#:

C# (pronounced “C-sharp”) is a free and open-source multi-paradigm programming language developed by Microsoft as part of its .NET initiative. C# was designed by Anders Hejlsberg and first appeared in 2000 with the release of .NET Framework. The language emphasizes type safety, component-oriented programming, and modern object-oriented programming concepts. C# syntax is similar to C++ and Java, but is tightly integrated with the .NET Common Language Runtime (CLR) environment.

== What type of language is C#? ==
- Programming language – artificial language designed to communicate instructions to a computer
- Compiled language – compiled to Common Intermediate Language and executed by the Common Language Runtime
- General-purpose programming language
- Imperative programming – paradigm using statements that change program state, focusing on how to perform computation.
- Functional programming – treating computation as evaluation of functions, avoiding mutable state, focusing on what to compute.
- Component-oriented programming – reusable components with well-defined interfaces for modularity and code reuse.
- Statically typed programming language – type checking performed at compile time
- Managed code – runs in a virtual machine (VM) environment, the .NET Common Language Runtime (CLR), that handles memory management via garbage collection
- Object-oriented programming language

== History of C# ==
- Anders Hejlsberg – lead architect and creator of C#
- Microsoft – developer and maintainer of C#
- 2000 – C# first appeared as part of .NET Framework development
- 2002 – C# 1.0 released with Visual Studio .NET
- 2007 – C# 3.0 added LINQ, lambda expressions, and extension methods
- 2012 – C# 5.0 added async and await and caller info attributes
- 2015 – C# 6.0 added expression-bodied members, string interpolation, and Roslyn.
- 2014 – .NET Core introduced as an open-source and cross-platform implementation
- 2020 – .NET 5 unified .NET Framework and .NET Core
- 2024 – C# 13 added params collections and partial properties

== General C# concepts ==
- Assemblies
- Attributes
- Async/await
- Asynchronous programming
- Classes and objects
- Collections
- Delegates
- Encapsulation
- Events
- Exception handling
- Garbage collection
- Generics
- Inheritance
- Interfaces
- Lambdas
- Language Integrated Query
- Memory management
- Namespaces
- Nullable type
- Operator overloading
- Pattern matching
- Properties
- Records
- Reflective programming
- Serialization
- Structs
- Threads and tasks
- Type inference
- Unit testing
- Value type and reference type

== Issues, limits ==
- Garbage collection overhead
- Platform dependencies

== C# toolchain ==
=== Compilers ===
- Roslyn – open-source compiler platform for C# and VB.NET
- Mono – cross-platform implementation of C# and .NET
- Bartok – experimental AOT compiler by Microsoft Research
- CoreRT – .NET Foundation project for AOT and JIT compilation
- IL2CPU – AOT compiler used by the COSMOS operating system
- RemObjects C# – AOT compiler supporting multiple platforms
- RyuJIT – JIT compiler used in .NET Core and .NET 5+
- SharpDevelop – open-source IDE and C# compiler under LGPL
- Visual C# – Microsoft’s primary JIT compiler for C#
- Visual C# Express – freeware edition of Visual C# for beginners
- Portable.NET – discontinued AOT compiler from the DotGNU project

=== Build and package management ===
- MSBuild – Microsoft’s official build engine
- NuGet – official .NET package manager and registry
- dotnet CLI – command-line interface for building, running, and publishing C# applications.

=== C# libraries and frameworks ===
- .NET Standard – specification ensuring API compatibility across .NET implementations
- ASP.NET Core – framework for building web applications and APIs
- Entity Framework Core – object-relational mapper (ORM)
- Xamarin – framework for building cross-platform mobile applications
- Blazor – framework for building interactive web UIs with C#
- Unity – game engine using C# as its primary scripting language

=== Testing and benchmarking ===
- xUnit – popular open-source testing framework
- NUnit – testing framework for .NET
- MSTest – Microsoft’s built-in test framework
- BenchmarkDotNet – library for performance benchmarking in C#

== Notable projects written in C# ==
- Unity
- VS Code extensions
- Godot with C# scripting support
- Microsoft Office add-ins
- Visual Studio Tools for Office

== Example source code ==
- Articles with example C# code

== C# publications ==
=== Books about C# ===
- Andrew Troelsen – Pro C# and the .NET Platform
- Bill Wagner – Effective C#
- Herbert Schildt – C#: A Beginner's Guide and C# 4.0: The Complete Reference
- Jeff Prosise – Programming Microsoft .NET
- Jeffrey Richter – CLR via C#
- Jennifer Greene – Head First C#
- Jon Skeet – C# in Depth
- Mark J. Price – C# 12 and .NET 8 – Modern Cross-Platform Development
- Rob Miles – The C# Programming Yellow Book

== C# dialects and related languages ==
- Visual Basic .NET – shares the same runtime and type system
- F# – functional-first language on the .NET platform
- PowerShell – built on .NET and C#
- Q# – quantum programming language from Microsoft influenced by C#

== C# learning resources ==
- Introduction to C#
- Official Microsoft C# documentation
- C# overview page
- W3Schools – C# tutorials
- GeeksforGeeks – C# basics

=== Competitive programming ===
- LeetCode – supports C# submissions
- HackerRank – includes C# challenges
- Codeforces – supports C# in contests

== See also ==
- Comparison of C Sharp and Java
- Outline of computer programming
- Outline of software
- Outline of software engineering

Outlines of other programming languages

- Outline of the C programming language
- Outline of the C++ programming language
- Outline of the Java programming language
- Outline of the JavaScript programming language
- Outline of the Perl programming language
- Outline of the Python programming language
- Outline of the Rust programming language
