= Robert Miles (disambiguation) =

Robert Miles (1969–2017) was a Swiss-Italian record producer, composer, musician and DJ.

Robert Miles may also refer to:

- Robert Miles (sociologist), British scholar and former professor of sociology
- Rob Miles (born 1957), British academic and computer scientist
- Robert Miles (cricketer) (1846–1930), English amateur cricketer
- Robert Miles (judge) (born 1962), judge of the High Court of England and Wales
- Robert Miles (rugby league) (born 1976), former Australian professional rugby league player
- Robert E. Miles (1925–1992), white-supremacist leader from Michigan
