= Rob Miles =

Computer scientist (born 1957)

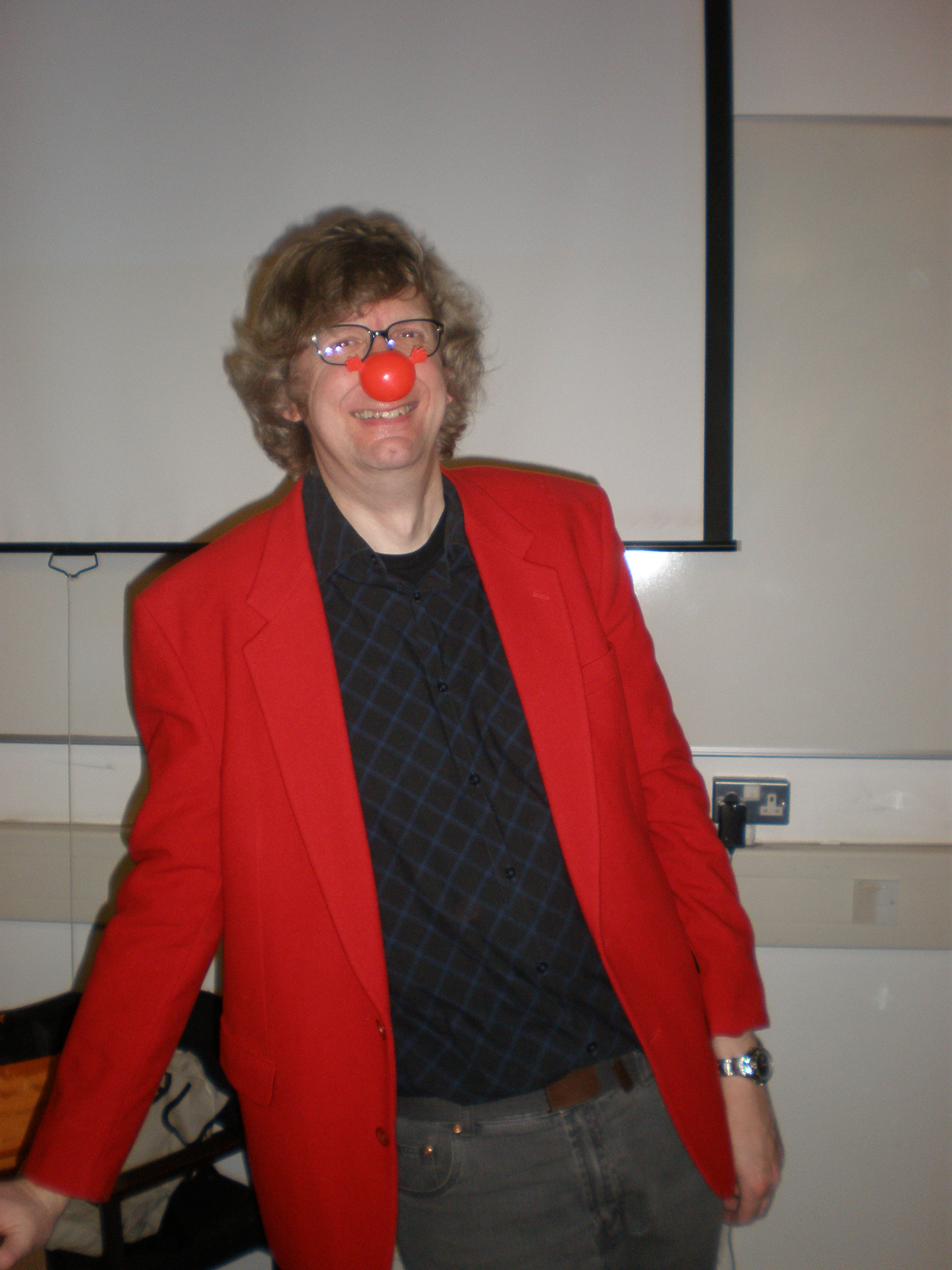
- Rob after a Red Nose Day "Lecture in Rhyme"
- Born: 23 July 1957
- Known for: Lecturer
- Awards: MS MVP
- Scientific career
- Fields: Computer science
- Institutions: University of Hull

Rob Miles (born 23 July 1957) is a Microsoft Most Valuable Professional, and a former lecturer in programming C Sharp and other elements of software engineering at the University of Hull.

Miles has given speeches worldwide on topics including C Sharp, Microsoft XNA, Windows Mobile development and embedded development using the .NET Micro Framework. He has written an XNA book, and he co-authored a book about the .NET Micro Framework with Donald Thompson.

Miles has also repeatedly been a member of the judging team of the yearly Microsoft Imagine Cup. In 2009, he was selected as a Captain of the software design competition.

Miles currently hosts a monthly Arduino Hardware Group as part of the Hull Digital Group at The Centre for Digital Innovation Beta.

== Bibliography ==
- Microsoft XNA Game Studio 2.0: Learn Programming Now!, Rob Miles. Microsoft Press, 2008 ISBN 978-0-7356-2522-8
- Microsoft XNA Game Studio 3.0: Learn Programming Now!, Rob Miles. Microsoft Press, 2009 ISBN 978-0-7356-2658-4
- Embedded Programming with the Microsoft .NET Micro Framework, Donald Thompson, Rob Miles. Microsoft Press, 2007 ISBN 978-0-7356-2365-1
- More Microsoft XNA Game Studio 3.0: Create Great Games: Learn Programming Now!, Rob Miles. Microsoft Press, 2009 ISBN 978-0-7356-2659-1
- Learn C# Now Toolkit, John Sharp, Rob Miles (Author). Microsoft Press, 2008 ISBN 978-0-7356-2598-3
- Introduction to Programming Through Game Development Using Microsoft XNA Game Studio, Rob Miles. Microsoft Press, 2009 ISBN 978-0-7356-2713-0
- Uml & Java for Software Development, Rob Miles. John Wiley & Sons, 2001 ISBN 978-0-471-49855-1
