= Jeff Prosise =

Computer writer

Jeff Prosise is a technical author on Microsoft Windows applications. He is very experienced in Microsoft Windows technologies like MFC, .NET Framework, C# and others.

== Publications ==
Jeff Prosise is the author of the book Programming Windows with MFC, published by Microsoft Press. His book is about the MFC, a C++ based proprietary programming library for Microsoft Windows. This book, along with Charles Petzold's popular Programming Windows book are considered to be 'bibles' in Windows programming. While Petzold's book is known as the 'Windows API bible', Prosise's book is often referred to as the 'MFC bible'.

Some of his other publications are Programming Microsoft .NET, Programming Windows with C# and How Computer Graphics Work (co-author Gary Suen). His previous books, published back in the 1980s and 1990s, included PC Magazine DOS 6 Techniques And Utilities, PC Magazine DOS 6 Memory Management With Utilities, and Windows Desktop Utilities.
