= C4DI =

Business space in Hull, England

Coordinates: 53.7387°N 0.3329°W

Centre for Digital Innovation

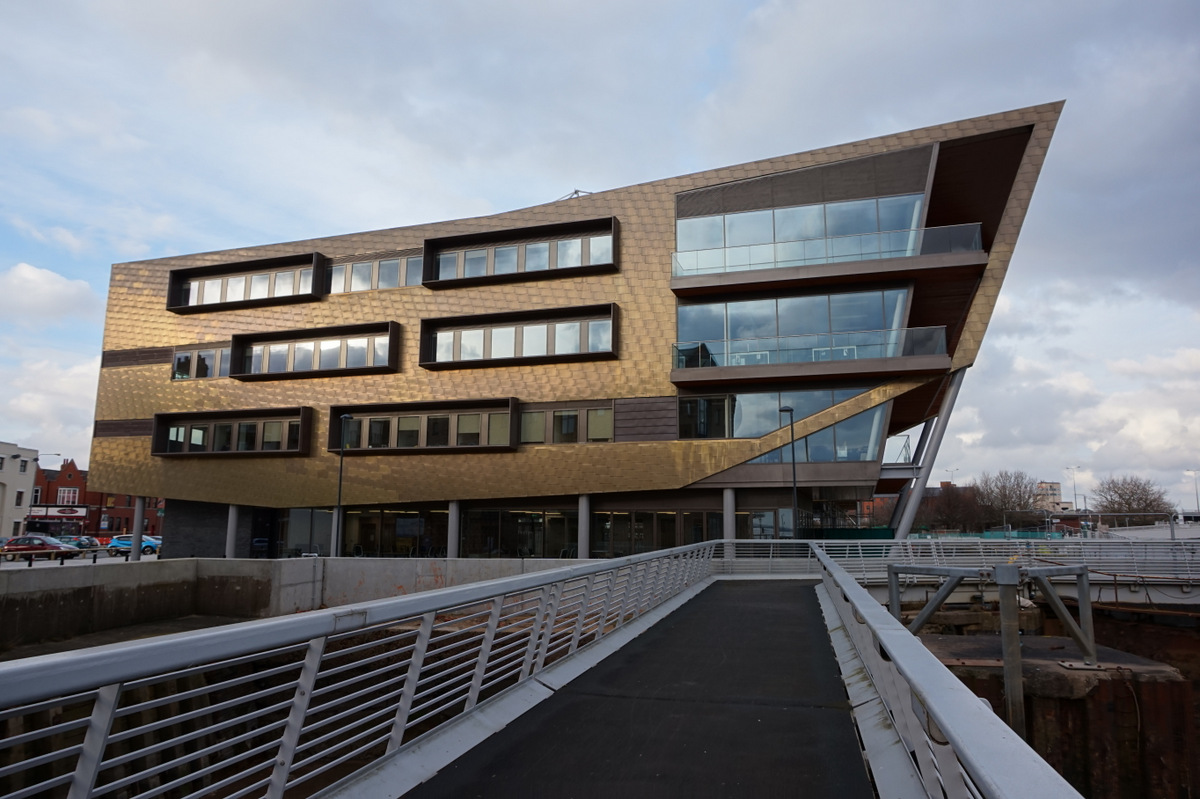
- Trade name: C4DI
- Type: Business Incubator
- Founder: Jon Moss, John Connolly, David Keel, Wykeland Group, University of Hull, KCOM
- Headquarters: Kingston upon Hull, England
- Website: www.c4di.co.uk

The Centre for Digital Innovation (C4DI) is a 24/7-access tech and creative coworking space based at the heart of the @TheDock tech campus in Hull, England. Founded in 2014, it offers flexible workspace, private offices, and meeting rooms suitable for meetings, training sessions, and events. C4DI supports a diverse community of startups, scaleups, freelancers, and established businesses through mentoring, industry connections, and a wide range of events. These include professional and personal development workshops, wellbeing sessions, and networking opportunities. While it occasionally delivers innovation programmes and startup incubators, its main focus is providing space, support, and collaboration opportunities across the digital and creative sectors. In 2025, C4DI’s headquarters underwent a major refurbishment to expand coworking areas and improve member facilities.

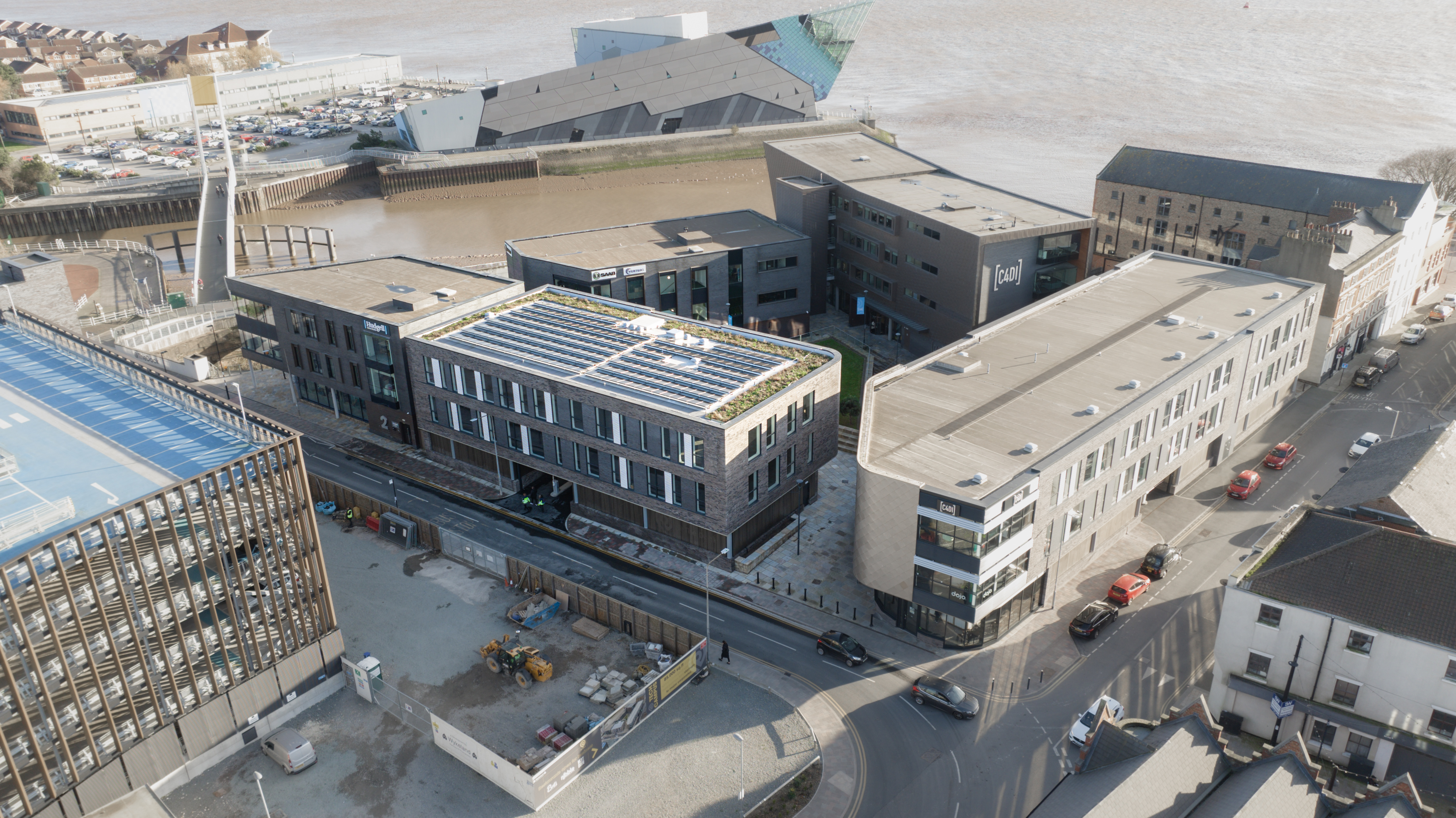
Aerial view of the C4DI building and @TheDock tech campus in Hull

== History and partnerships ==
C4DI was launched in 2014 as part of a wider regeneration effort in Hull’s Fruit Market area, with support from the Wykeland Group and local stakeholders. The organisation was set up to bring together digital talent, startups, and businesses in a shared community environment.

Early partnerships included companies such as Amazon Web Services, Kingston Communications, and PwC, who provided technical support, mentoring, and connections for C4DI’s members. In its early years, C4DI hosted startup programmes and events designed to accelerate digital business growth.

== Facilities ==
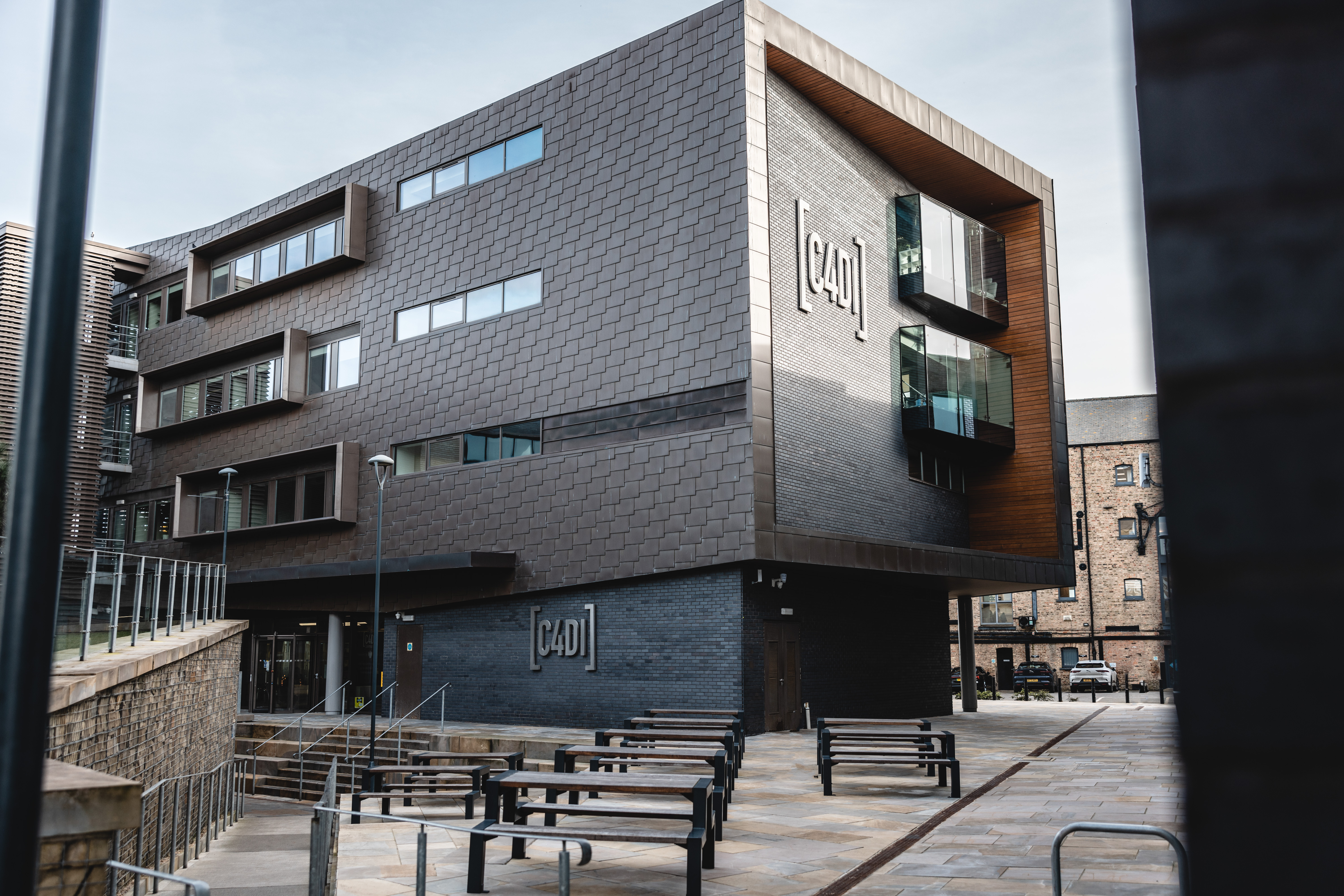
Exterior of the Centre for Digital Innovation (C4DI) in Hull, England

C4DI is based in the @TheDock campus in Hull, a technology-focused site developed by Wykeland Group. The building includes coworking spaces, private offices, meeting rooms, and event spaces. Members have 24/7 access and benefit from communal kitchen and lounge areas, secure entry, high-speed internet, and flexible booking for rooms.

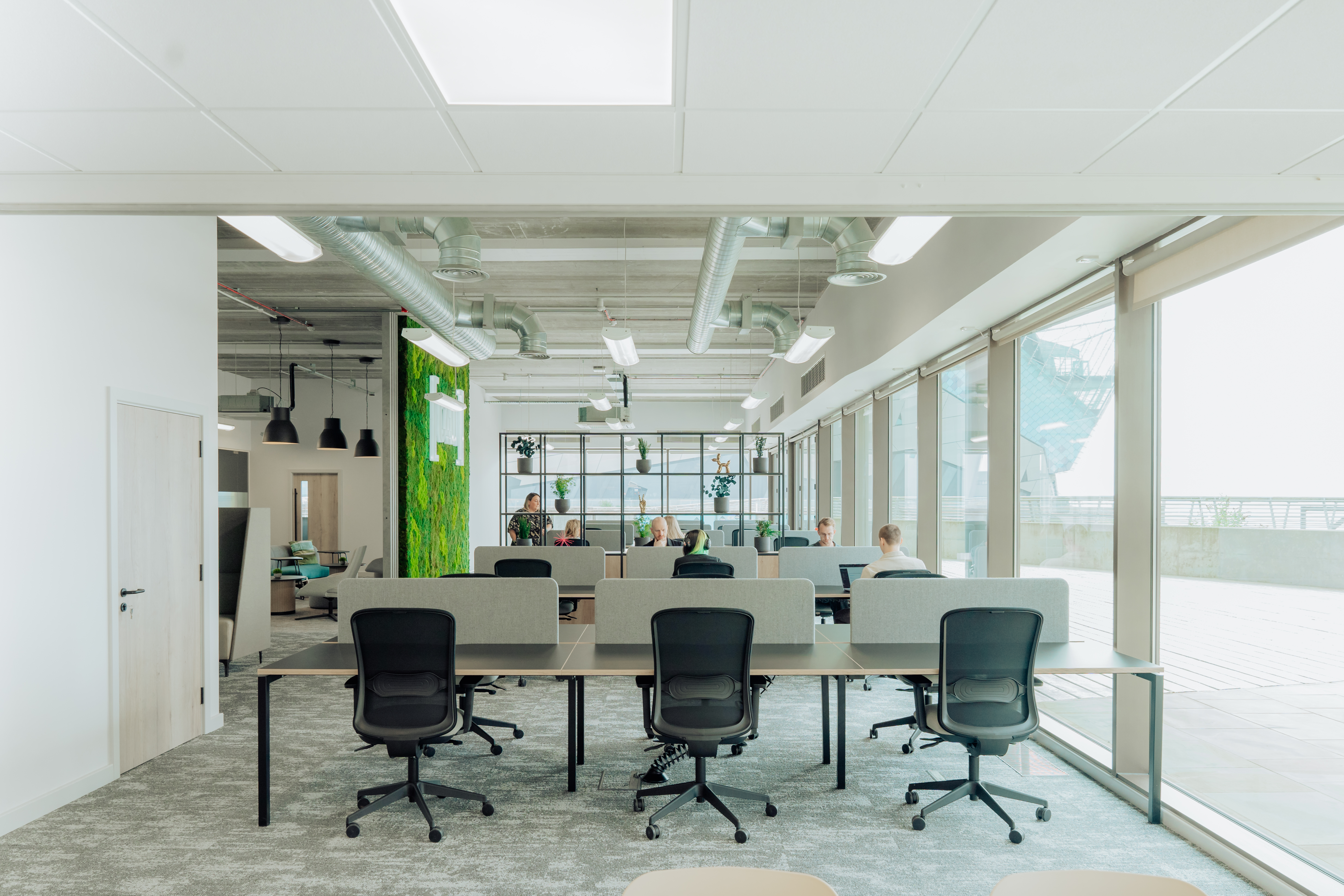
Refurbished coworking area inside the C4DI building, completed as part of the 2025 redesign.

In 2025, the ground floor of C4DI was refurbished to mark the organisation’s 10-year anniversary. The refurbishment included the creation of a larger business lounge, updated meeting rooms with enhanced video conferencing facilities, secluded booths for individual work, and new interior features such as moss walls and industrial detailing. The redesign aimed to improve functionality for members and better accommodate a growing mix of businesses, freelancers, and remote workers.

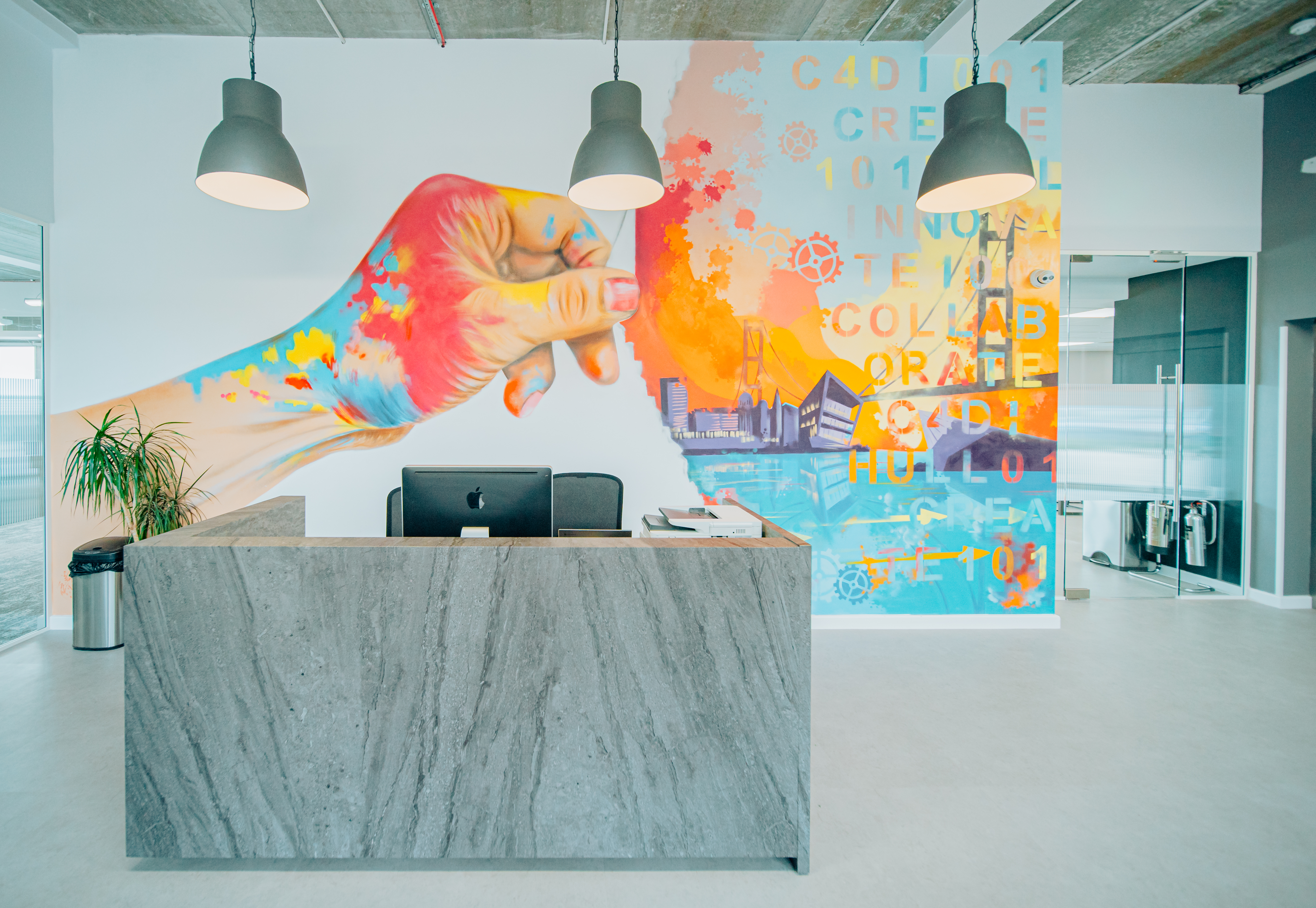
Reception mural at C4DI, created by Hull-based artist, Annie Berry during the 2025 refurbishment.

As part of the 2025 refurbishment, Hull-based artist Annie Berry was commissioned to create a large-scale spray-painted mural in the main reception.

== Community and members ==
C4DI’s membership includes startups, freelancers, scaleups, and corporate teams. Members work across sectors such as software, design, data, marketing, logistics, and engineering. Well-known organisations with a presence at C4DI include Boots No7, GXO, Nestlé, Siemens Gamesa, and Rix.

Coworking memberships offer 24/7 access to flexible space, fixed desks, private offices, or virtual plans. Corporate members have access to the workspace and community and can also collaborate on innovation projects with startups, freelancers, and creatives through facilitated challenges and introductions.

== Recent developments ==
In June 2025, C4DI became home to Space Humber, a new initiative supporting innovation in the space sector across the Yorkshire and Humber region.

C4DI also continues to host a wide variety of events throughout the year, including professional development workshops, skills sessions, and wellbeing programmes. In 2025, it announced a partnership with Quickline Communications to deliver 18 events over three years, supporting business growth and digital adoption in East Riding and North Lincolnshire.
