= Review Board =

Code review tool

- Original authors: Christian Hammond and David Trowbridge
- Initial release: May 17, 2007; 18 years ago
- Stable release: 7.0.4 / 6 August 2025; 5 months ago
- Repository: github.com/reviewboard/reviewboard
- Written in: Python, Django
- Operating system: Cross-platform
- Available in: English
- Type: Code review
- License: MIT License
- Website: www.reviewboard.org

Review Board is a web-based collaborative code review tool, available as free software under the MIT License.

An alternative to Rietveld and Gerrit, Review Board integrates with Bazaar, ClearCase, CVS, Git, Mercurial, Perforce, and Subversion.

Review Board can be installed on any server running Apache or lighttpd and is free for both personal and commercial use.

There is also an official commercial Review Board hosting service, RBCommons.

Review requests can be posted manually or automatically using either a REST Web API, or a Python script.

== Users ==
Some of the notable users of Review Board are:

- Cisco
- Citrix
- Novell
- NetApp
- Twitter
- VMware
- Yelp
- Yahoo
- LinkedIn
- Apache Software Foundation
- HBase
- Calligra
- Konsole
- Amazon
- Cloudera
- Hewlett Packard Enterprise
- Tableau Software

== See also ==
- List of tools for code review
