= List of tools for code review =

This is a list of collaborative code review software that supports the software development practice of software peer review.

Software	Maintainer	Development status	License	VCS supported	Platforms supported	Workflow
CodePeer	MNT Labs	actively developed	Proprietary	Git	All	pre- and post-commit
Collaborator	SmartBear Software	actively developed	Proprietary	Git, Subversion, Perforce, ClearCase, Mercurial, Rational Team Concert, TFS, Synergy	Linux, macOS, Windows	pre- and post-commit
Crucible	Atlassian	in maintenance	Proprietary	CVS, Subversion, Git, Mercurial, Perforce	Java	pre- and post-commit
Dimensions CM PulseUno	Micro Focus	actively developed	Proprietary	Dimensions CM, Git	Linux, macOS, Windows	pre- and post-commit
Helix Swarm	Perforce	actively developed	Proprietary	Helix Core	Linux, macOS, Windows	pre- and post-commit
Helix Teamhub	Perforce	actively developed	Proprietary	Git, Subversion, Mercurial	Linux, macOS, Windows	pre- and post-commit
Gerrit	Google, Inc.	actively developed	Apache v2	Git	Java EE	pre-commit
Gitea	Gitea	actively developed	MIT	Git	Linux, macOS, Windows	pre- and post-commit
GitHub	GitHub, Inc.	actively developed	Proprietary	Git	Linux, macOS, Windows	pre- and post-commit
GitLab	GitLab Inc.	actively developed	MIT	Git	Ruby on Rails	pre- and post-commit
Kallithea	kallithea-scm.org	actively developed	GPL v3	Git, Mercurial	Python	post-commit
Kiuwan	Optimyth Technologies	actively developed	Proprietary	CVS, Subversion, Git, Mercurial	Linux, macOS, Windows	pre- and post-commit
Patchwork	Stephen Finucane	actively developed	GPL v2	VCS-agnostic	Python	mailing list
Phabricator	Phacility	End of life	Apache	Git, Subversion, Mercurial	PHP	pre- and post-commit
Rational Team Concert Code Review	IBM	actively developed	Proprietary	Rational Team Concert	Linux, macOS, Windows	pre- and post-commit
Review Board	reviewboard.org	actively developed	MIT	CVS, Subversion, Git (partial), Mercurial, Bazaar, Perforce, ClearCase, Plastic SCM	Python	pre- and post-commit
Rietveld	Guido van Rossum	actively developed	Apache v2	Git, Subversion, Mercurial, Perforce, CVS	Python	pre-commit
RhodeCode	RhodeCode	actively developed	AGPL v3	Git, Subversion, Mercurial	Python	pre- and post-commit
