= Phabricator =

Suite of development collaboration tools

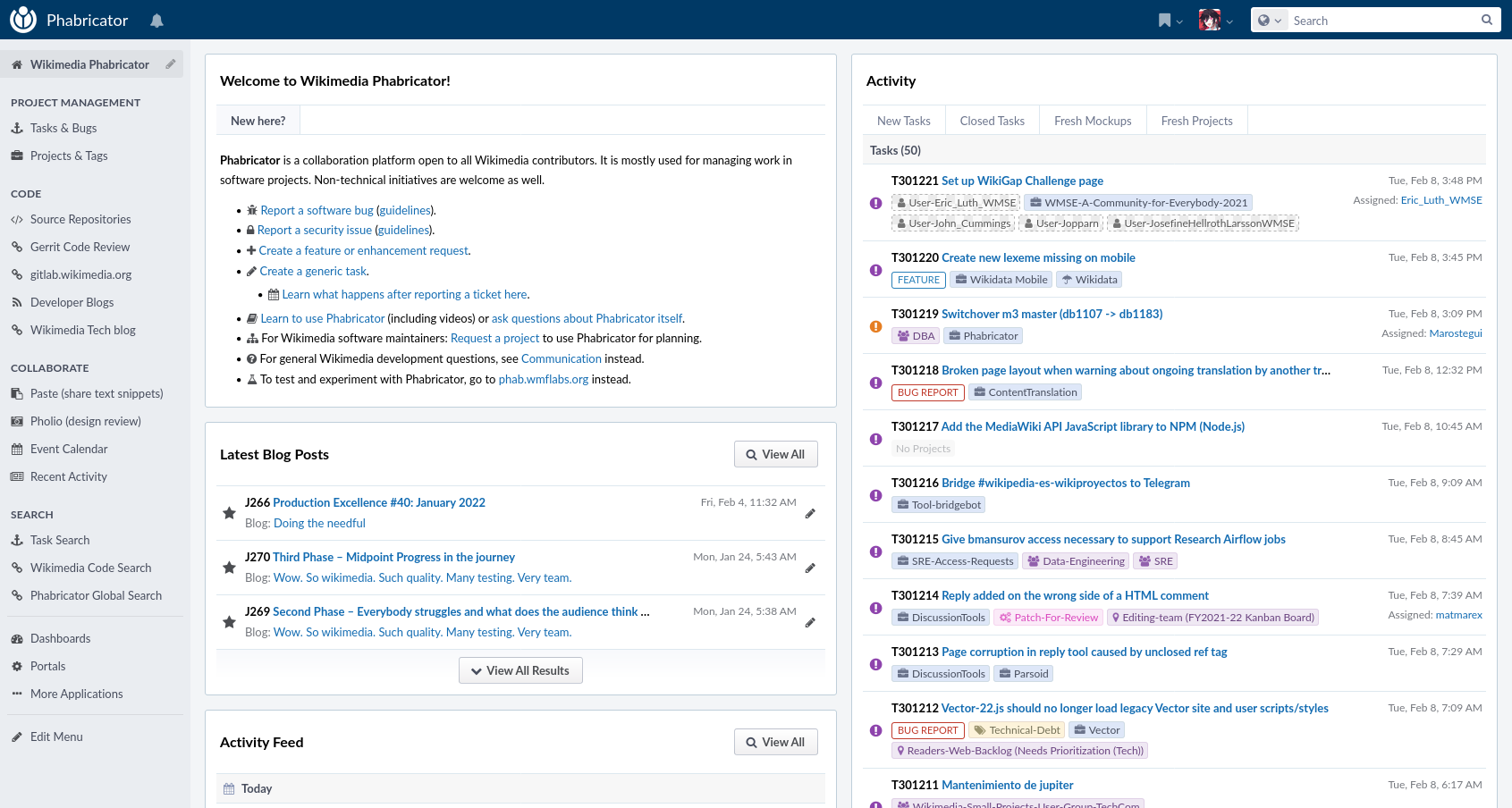
- Screenshot of Wikimedia Phabricator
- Original author: Evan Priestley / Facebook, Inc.
- Developers: Phacility, Inc
- Release: 2010; 16 years ago
- Written in: PHP
- Operating system: Unix-like
- Platform: Cross-platform
- Available in: English
- Type: Code review, bug tracker
- License: Apache License 2.0
- Website: phacility.com/phabricator/
- Repository: github.com/phacility/phabricator

Phabricator is a free and open source suite of web-based development collaboration tools.

Its suite of tools includes Differential, a code review tool; Diffusion, a repository browser; Herald, a change monitoring tool; Maniphest, a bug tracker; and Phriction, a wiki. It integrates with Git, Mercurial, and Subversion.

Phabricator was originally developed as an internal tool at Facebook overseen by Evan Priestley. Priestley left Facebook in 2011 to continue Phabricator's development in a new company called Phacility.

Phacility announced that it was winding down operations and placing Phabricator in a bare minimum maintenance mode on June 1, 2021, with no future updates expected.

A community fork, Phorge, was created and announced its stable release to the public on September 7, 2022, and is actively updated. In 2026, Phorge was mentioned by the press as a potential inspiration for new GitHub features.

Phabricator and Phorge have a localization framework but do not provide translations other than English by default. Wikimedia community maintains an extension to provide more languages. Translations are editable on translatewiki.net.

== Notable users ==
Phabricator and its forks have been used by:

- AngularJS
- Asana
- Blender
- Discord
- Dropbox
- Facebook
- FreeBSD
- GnuPG
- Khan Academy
- KDE
- Mozilla
- LLVM/Clang/LLDB (debugger)/LLD (linker)
- Lubuntu
- SingleStore (formerly MemSQL)
- Pinterest
- Quora
- Twitter
- Uber
- Wikimedia Foundation, using their own fork
- Wildfire Games
- Bohemia Interactive

== Gallery ==
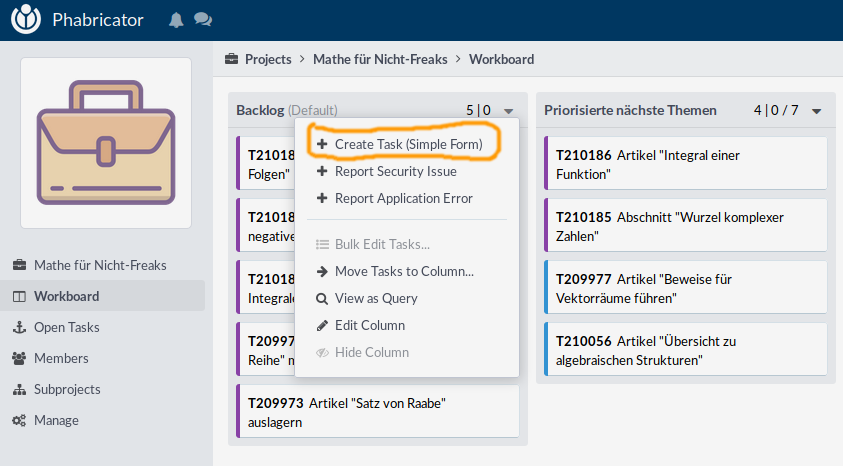
A Phabricator workboard

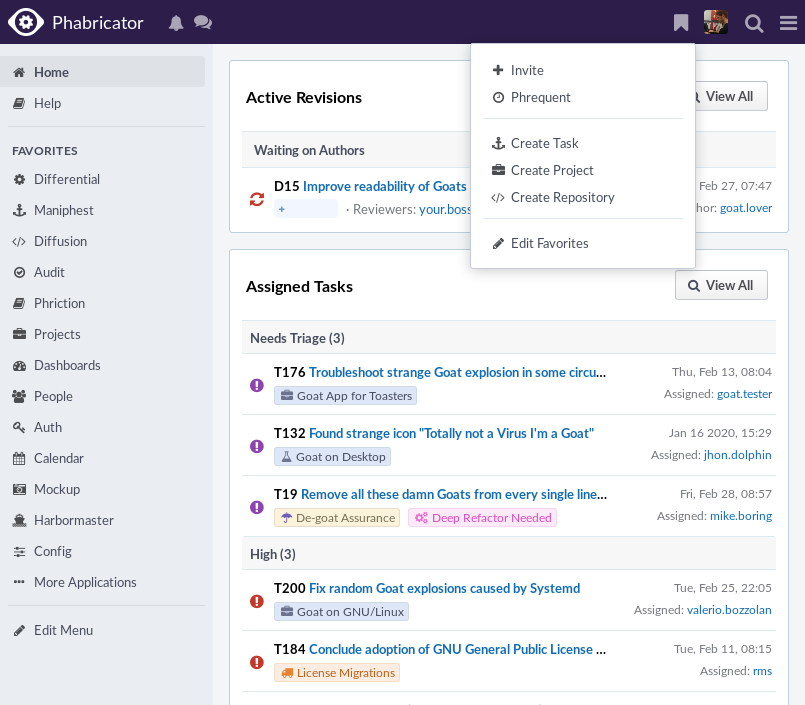
A generic Phabricator homepage

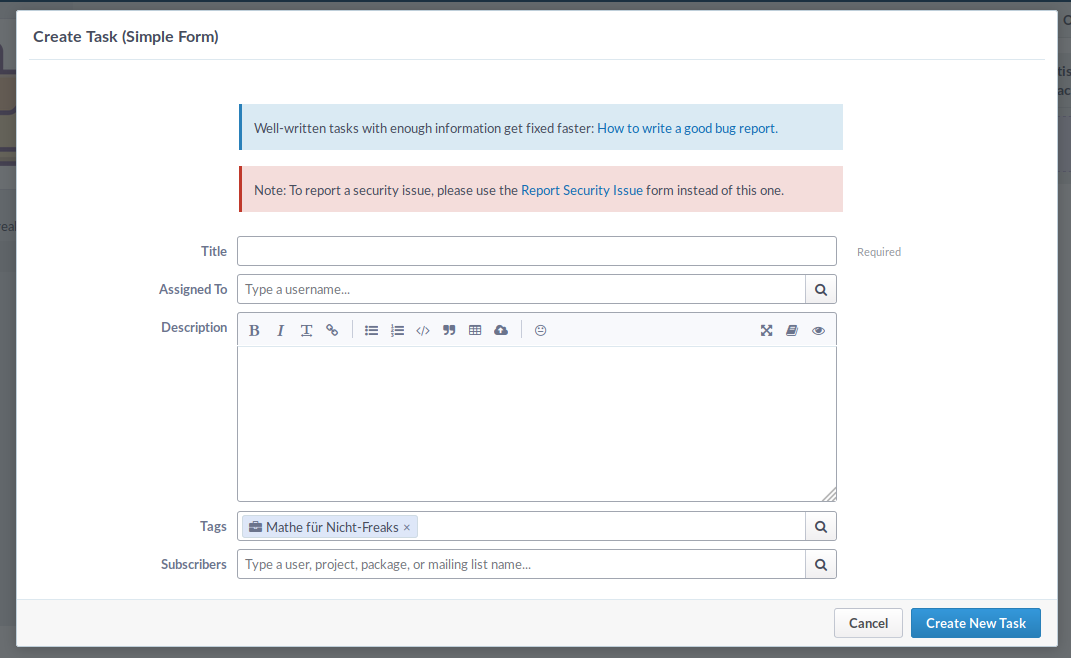
An example of a task form creation

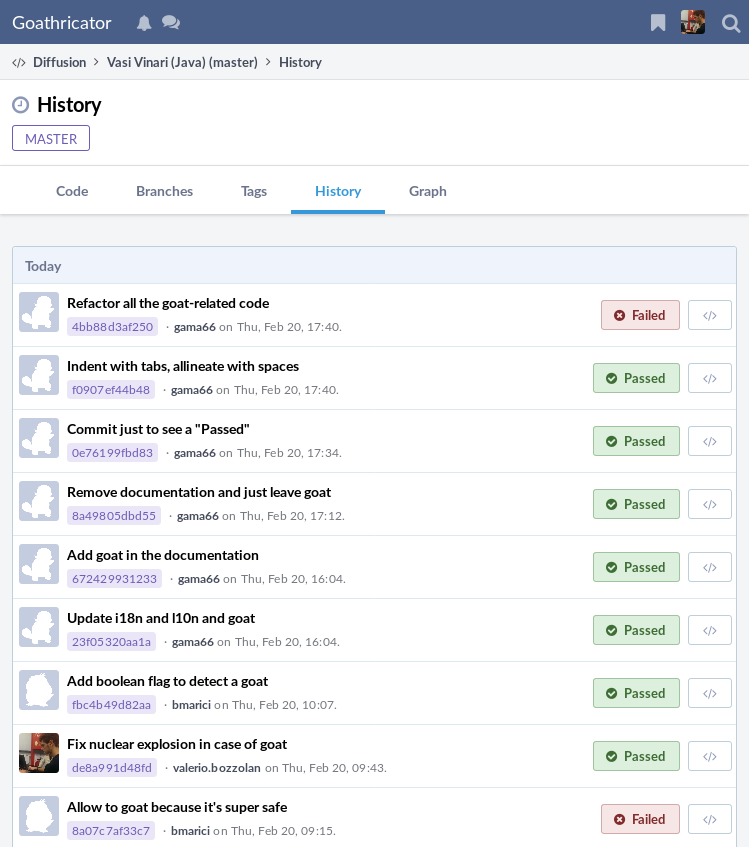
Continuous integration in Phabricator

Some user-defined Phabricator projects

== See also ==
- List of tools for code review
