= Sun WorkShop TeamWare =

Sun WorkShop TeamWare (later Forte TeamWare, then Forte Code Management Software) is a distributed source code revision control system made by Sun Microsystems. It was first announced in November 1992 as SPARCworks/TeamWare and ProWorks/TeamWare and made commercially available in 1993. Last available as part of the Forte Developer 6 update 2 product, TeamWare is no longer being offered for sale, and is not part of the Sun Studio product.

TeamWare's largest deployment was inside Sun itself, where (bar a few exceptions) at one point it was the only VCS used. TeamWare had been used to manage Sun's largest source trees, including those for Solaris and Java, but as part of the process of converting those code bases to open source communities, they were moved to newer revision control systems such as Mercurial.

TeamWare features a number of advanced features not found in earlier version control systems like RCS and CVS. In particular, it features a hierarchy of source repositories, and allows atomic updates of multiple files, features found in later version-control systems such as Subversion and Perforce. TeamWare allows distributed development by copying a repository to another which might reside on another machine or network. Developers can then commit changes to the local copy of the repository, periodically integrating accumulated changes in the local repository back into the original repository.

TeamWare is implemented as a layer over the older SCCS, which is used to track changes to individual files. TeamWare works only by a system of files accessed by client programs (interacting without a server) and most distributed users of a repository access it by means of a mounted networked filesystem such as NFS.

Evan Adams was the architectural lead for TeamWare. Glenn Skinner was the inventor of smoosh and Larry McVoy authored smoosh, a tool to merge SCCS files, which is said to be a precursor to TeamWare. The BitKeeper version control system, designed by McVoy, shares a number of design concepts with the earlier TeamWare.
