= DVCS =

DVCS may refer to:

- Data Validation and Certification Server
- Deeply virtual Compton scattering
- Distributed version control system
- Direct View Camera System
