= Gerrit (software) =

Free web-based team code collaboration tool

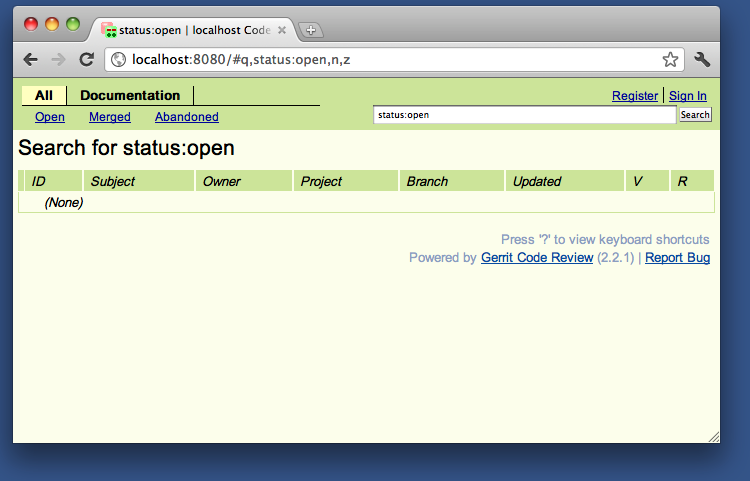
- Original author: Google
- Release: 2 November 2009; 16 years ago (independent release, labelled version 2)
- Stable release: 3.14.4 / 23 September 2026
- Written in: Java
- Platform: Java Platform, Enterprise Edition
- Available in: English
- Type: Code review
- License: Apache License 2.0
- Website: www.gerritcodereview.com
- Repository: gerrit.googlesource.com/gerrit

Gerrit (/ˈɡɛrɪt/ GERR-it) is a free, web-based team code collaboration tool. Software developers in a team can review each other's modifications on their source code using a Web browser and approve or reject those changes. It integrates closely with Git, a distributed version control system.

Gerrit is a fork of Rietveld, a code review tool for Subversion. Both are named after Dutch designer Gerrit Rietveld.

== History ==
Originally written in Python like Rietveld, it is now written in Java (Java EE Servlet) with SQL since version 2 and a custom-made Git-based database (NoteDb) since version 3.

In versions 2.0–2.16 Gerrit used Google Web Toolkit for its browser-based front-end. After being developed and used in parallel with GWT for versions 2.14–2.16, a new Polymer web UI replaced the GWT UI in version 3.0.

== See also ==
- List of tools for code review
