= SourcePuller =

Free alternative client for accessing the BitKeeper version control system

- Original author: Andrew Tridgell
- Release: 21 April 2005; 21 years ago
- Written in: C
- Operating system: Linux
- Type: Version control
- License: GNU General Public License v2-or-later
- Website: sourcepuller.sourceforge.io
- Repository: sourceforge.net/projects/sourcepuller/

SourcePuller is a free software client for accessing the BitKeeper version control system. It was originally developed by Andrew Tridgell, who – according to BitKeeper developer Larry McVoy – reverse engineered the BitKeeper protocol. While not widely used itself, it is best known for triggering the BitKeeper controversy, which sparked the switch of the Linux kernel from BitKeeper to Git.
