= Kallithea (software) =

Free software Git and Mercurial repository hosting

- Developer: Software Freedom Conservancy
- Initial release: July 4, 2014; 11 years ago
- Stable release: 0.7.0 / May 27, 2021; 4 years ago
- Repository: kallithea-scm.org/repos/kallithea
- Written in: Python
- Operating system: Platform-independent
- Type: revision control, project management software, code review
- License: GNU GPL (version 3)
- Website: kallithea-scm.org

Kallithea is a cross-platform free software source code management system, the primary goal of which is to provide a repository hosting service with features for collaboration, such as forking, pull requests, code review, issue tracking etc. Kallithea is a fork of RhodeCode, created after the original developer had changed the license terms. While earlier versions of RhodeCode were licensed entirely under the GNU General Public License version 3, RhodeCode version 2.0 (released in August 2013) introduced exceptions for parts of the software distribution. According to Bradley M. Kuhn of Software Freedom Conservancy, this exception statement is ambiguous and "leaves the redistributor feeling unclear about their rights".

Kallithea is mostly written in Python.

Kallithea is a member project of Software Freedom Conservancy.

== Features ==
Kallithea supports hosting repositories of Mercurial and Git version control systems. Repositories can be grouped and thus allow to define common properties like access control. Its web interface for projects allows to fork as well as management of pull requests. It can also be used to quickly exchange code snippets by means of a revision controlled pastebin ("gists").

== See also ==
- Comparison of project management software
- List of tools for code review
- Comparison of source code hosting facilities
- Apache Allura
- Apache Bloodhound
- Trac
