= Rietveld (software) =

Web-based collaborative code review tool

- Original author: Guido van Rossum
- Written in: Python, Django
- Operating system: Google App Engine
- Available in: English
- Type: Code review
- License: Apache License v2
- Website: codereview.appspot.com
- Repository: github.com/rietveld-codereview/rietveld

Rietveld is a web-based collaborative code review tool for Subversion written by Guido van Rossum to run on Google's cloud service. Van Rossum based Rietveld on the experience he had writing Mondrian, a proprietary application used internally by Google to review its code.

Rietveld was named by van Rossum after Gerrit Rietveld, who he described as "one of my favorite Dutch architects and the designer of the Zig-Zag chair".

== See also ==
- Gerrit – a fork of Rietveld
- List of tools for code review
