= Rzip =

Data compression computer program

rzip
- Original author: Andrew Tridgell
- Stable release: 2.1 / 14 February 2006; 20 years ago
- Written in: C
- Operating system: Unix-like
- Size: 46K (source code tarball, gzipped)
- Website: rzip.samba.org

rzip is a huge-scale data compression computer program designed around initial LZ77-style string matching on a 900 MB dictionary window, followed by bzip2-based Burrows–Wheeler transform and entropy coding (Huffman) on 900 kB output chunks.

== Compression algorithm ==
rzip operates in two stages. The first stage finds and encodes large chunks of duplicated data over potentially very long distances (900 MB) in the input file. The second stage uses a standard compression algorithm (bzip2) to compress the output of the first stage.

It is quite common these days to need to compress files that contain long distance redundancies. For example, when compressing a set of home directories several users might have copies of the same file, or of quite similar files. It is also common to have a single file that contains large duplicated chunks over long distances, such as PDF files containing repeated copies of the same image. Most compression programs won't be able to take advantage of this redundancy, and thus might achieve a much lower compression ratio than rzip can achieve.

The intermediate interface between the two stages is made of a byte-aligned data stream of which there are two commands, a literal ("add") with length and data:

 type:8       = 0 => literal/add range of count bytes
 count:16     = 1..65535
 data:8..∞    = literal data to be inserted (n whole bytes)

and a match ("copy") with length and offset parameters:

 type:8       = 1 => match/copy range of count bytes
 count:16     = 31..65535
 offset:32    = offset to position to be copied from

Literal or match/copy lengths of greater than 65,535 bytes are split into multiple instructions. End-of-stream is indicated with a zero-length literal/add (type=0,count=0) command and immediately followed by a 32-bit CRC checksum.

== Reference implementation ==
A rolling-checksum algorithm based on the one in rsync is used to locate potential matches from over such a large dataset. As the hash buckets fill up, previous hashes ("tags") are discarded based on twice. The tags are discarded in such a manner as to provide fairly good coverage, with a gradually decreasing match granularity as the distance increases. This implementation does not search for match lengths of fewer than 31 consecutive bytes.

== Advantages ==
The key difference between rzip and other well known compression algorithms is its ability to take advantage of very long distance redundancy. The well known deflate algorithm used in gzip uses a maximum history buffer of 32 KiB. The Burrows–Wheeler transform block sorting algorithm used in bzip2 is limited to 900 KiB of history. The history buffer in rzip can be up to 900 MiB long, several orders of magnitude larger than gzip or bzip2. Rzip is often much faster than bzip2, despite using the bzip2 library as a back end. This is because rzip feeds bzip2 with shrunken data, so that bzip2 has to do less work. Simple comparisons (although too small for it to be an authoritative benchmark) have been produced.

== Disadvantages ==
rzip is not suited for every purpose. The two biggest disadvantages of rzip are that it cannot be pipelined (so it cannot read from standard input or write to standard output), and that it uses a high amount of memory: a typical compression run on a large file might use hundreds of megabytes of RAM. If there is a lot of RAM to spare and a very high compression ratio is required, rzip should be used, but if these conditions are not satisfied, alternate compression methods such as gzip and bzip2, which are less memory-intensive, should be used instead of rzip. There is at least one patch to enable pipelining.

== History ==
rzip was originally written by Andrew Tridgell as part of his PhD research.

== Alternative implementations ==
=== lrzip ===
lrzip
- Original authors: Con Kolivas, Peter Hyman, Andrew Tridgell
- Release: January 2008; 18 years ago
- Stable release: 0.651 / 9 March 2022; 4 years ago
- Written in: C, C++ (libzpaq)
- Operating system: Unix-like
- Size: 246K (source code tarball, gzipped)
- Website: github.com/ckolivas/lrzip

lrzip (Long Range ZIP) is an improved version of rzip. Its file format (.lrz) is incompatible with rzip's. It has the following improvements:

- Choice of LZMA, LZO, DEFLATE, Bzip2, and ZPAQ compression (as opposed to Bzip2 only)
- No dictionary limit, not even limited by available RAM
- Ability to test data for compressibility before compressing, preventing the computer from wasting time by trying to compress incompressible data
- Ability to be pipelined from standard input / standard output (with a loss in compression ratio)
- Ability to disable last-stage compression for use with another compressor
- Optional AES-128 encryption

The lrzip distribution comes with a pair of programs to use it with tar, lrztar and lrzuntar.

=== rzip64 ===
rzip64 is an extension of rzip for very large files that can utilize multiple CPU cores in parallel. There are benchmark results. Most important, however, is the ability of rzip64 to be interrupted at any time. Thereby a running compression task (that may easily take several hours for large files) survives even a system maintenance reboot without losing already completed work and can be resumed later. The file format of rzip64 is identical to the original rzip.

=== REP ===
REP is an alternative implementation of rzip algorithm by Bulat Ziganshin used in his FreeArc archiver as preprocessor for LZMA/Tornado compression algorithms. In FreeArc, REP finds large-distance matches and then LZMA compress the remaining data. For example, on computer with 2 GB RAM, REP finds matches that is at least 512 bytes long at the distances up to 1 GB, and then LZMA finds any remaining matches at the distances up to 128 MB. So, working together, they provide the best compression possible on 2 GB RAM budget.

Being optimized for stream decompression and collaborative work with LZMA, REP has some differences from the original RZIP implementation. First, by default it finds only matches that are 512+ byte long, since benchmarking proved that this is optimal setting for overall REP+LZMA compression. Second, it uses a sliding dictionary that's about 1/2 RAM long, so decompression doesn't need to reread data from decompressed file. REP's advantage is its multiplicative rolling hash that is both quick to compute and has near-ideal distribution.

Larger minimal match length (512 bytes compared to 32 bytes in rzip) allowed for additional speed optimizations, so that REP provides very fast compression (about 200 MB/s on Intel i3-2100).

=== SREP ===
SREP (SuperREP) is an implementation of Tridgell's idea of LZ compressor that doesn't store its dictionary in RAM, using instead SHA1 hashes of processed blocks to compare their contents. It allows the program to compress files that are about 10x larger than RAM available. Decompression performed either by reading data from decompressed part of file, or by storing in the memory future matches (future-LZ compression algorithm). Of course, future-LZ compression requires 2 passes over input file but decompression needs tiny memory. In one experiment, 22 GB file compressed with minimum match length of 512 bytes and full 22 GB dictionary required just 2 GB of RAM for decompression.

== See also ==
- List of archive formats, Comparison of archive formats
- List of file archivers, Comparison of file archivers
