= Andrew Tridgell =

Australian computer programmer

Andrew Tridgell OAM
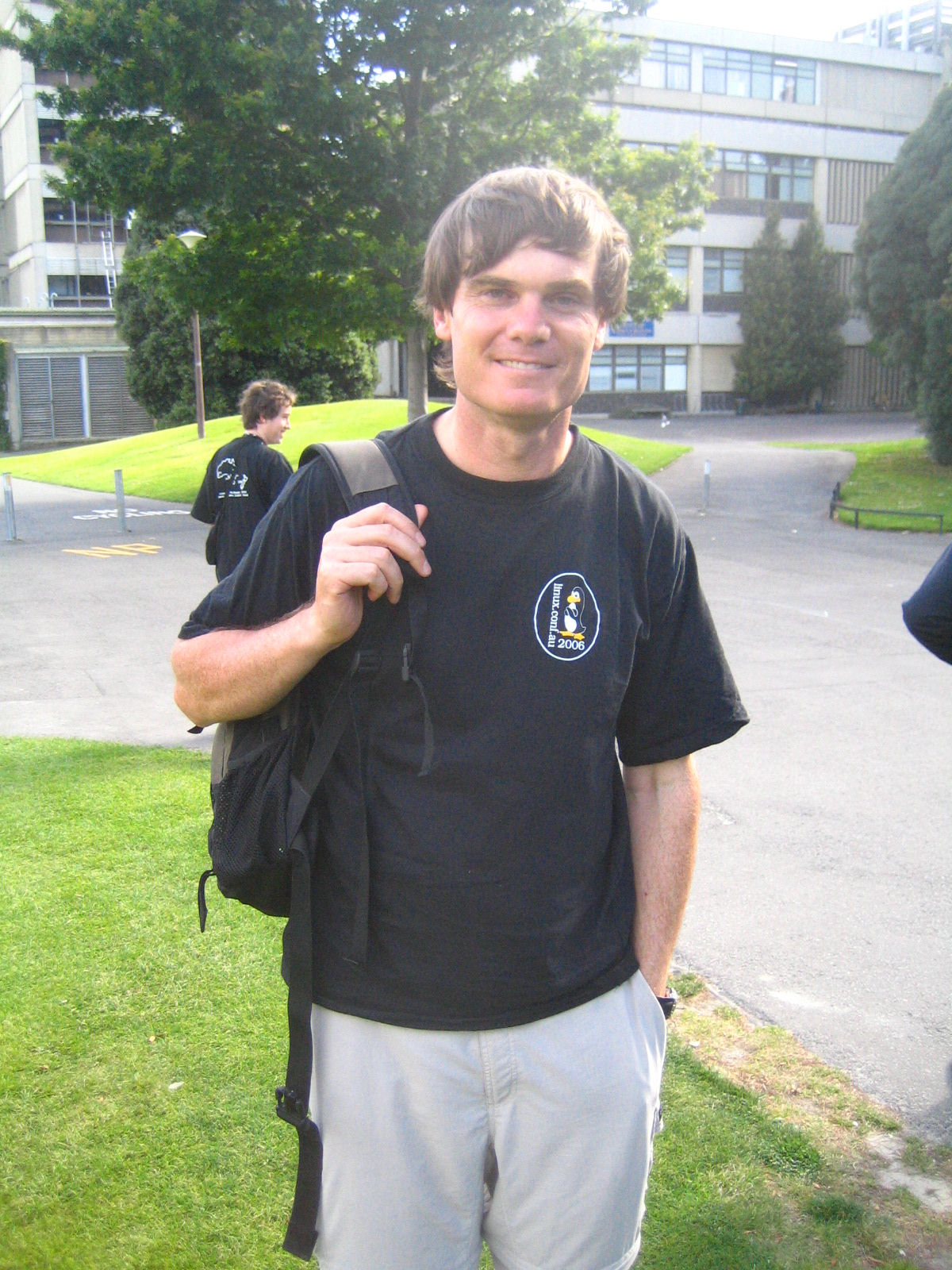
- Tridgell in 2006
- Born: 1967 (age 58–59); Sydney, Australia
- Other name: Tridge
- Occupation: Programmer
- Known for: rsync, Samba, rzip, ccache, ArduPilot

Andrew "Tridge" Tridgell (born 1967) is an Australian computer programmer. He is the author of and a contributor to the Samba file server, and co-inventor of the rsync algorithm.

He has analysed complex proprietary protocols and algorithms, to allow compatible free and open source software implementations.

== Projects ==
Tridgell was a major developer of the Samba software, analyzing the Server Message Block protocol used for workgroup and network file sharing by Microsoft Windows products. He developed the talloc hierarchical memory allocator, originally as part of Samba.

For his PhD dissertation, he co-developed rsync, including the rsync algorithm, a highly efficient file transfer and synchronisation tool. He was also the original author of rzip, which uses a similar algorithm to rsync. He developed spamsum, based on locality-sensitive hashing algorithms.

He is the author of KnightCap, a reinforcement-learning based chess engine.

Tridgell was also a leader in hacking the TiVo to make it work in Australia, which uses the PAL video format.

In April 2005, Tridgell tried to produce free software (now known as SourcePuller) that interoperated with the BitKeeper source code repository. This was cited as the reason that BitMover revoked a license allowing Linux developers free use of their BitKeeper product. Linus Torvalds, the creator of the Linux kernel, and Tridgell were thus involved in a public debate about the events, in which Tridgell stated that, not having bought or owned BitKeeper – and thus having never agreed to its license – he could not violate it, and was analyzing the protocol ethically, as he had done with Samba. Tridgell's involvement in the project resulted in Torvalds accusing him of playing dirty tricks with BitKeeper. Tridgell claimed his analysis started with simply telneting to a BitKeeper server and typing help. This incident triggered the creation of Git by Torvalds.

In 2011 Tridgell became involved with the software development of ArduPilot Mega, an open source Arduino-based UAV controller board, working on an entry with CanberraUAV for the UAV Challenge Outback Rescue.

== Academic achievements ==
Tridgell completed a PhD at the Computer Sciences Laboratory of the Australian National University. His original doctorate work was in the area of speech recognition but was never completed. His submitted dissertation 'Efficient Algorithms for Sorting and Synchronization' was based on his work on the rsync algorithm.

== Awards and honours ==
- In October 2003, The Bulletin magazine judged Tridgell to be Australia's smartest Information and Communications Technology person.
- In July 2008, Tridgell was named "Best Interoperator" at the Google–O'Reilly Open Source Awards, for his work on Samba and rsync.
- Tridgell (along with Jeremy Allison and Volker Lendecke) has been called a "guru in its traditional Indian meaning" by IT writer, Sam Varghese.
- On 11 December 2018, Tridgell was awarded the degree of Doctor of Science (Honoris Causa) by the Australian National University, for authoring Samba, co-inventing rsync; and contributions to free and open source software.
- On 26 January 2020, Tridgell was awarded the Medal (OAM) of the Order of Australia in the General Division for service to Information Technology. The biographical notes for the award noted his contributions to software development and education including his work on rsync, Samba, ArduPilot, MAVProxy as well as teaching at the Australian National University.
