= Upgrade =

Process of improving something by replacing part of it or adding additional parts

An upgrade is the result of improving something by replacing part of it or adding additional parts. For example, one can upgrade a computer by replacing the CPU with a faster one and by adding more RAM, and afterwards, the computer is an upgrade. Although often used in the context of technology, anything can be upgraded (improved).

Often an update is an upgrade but not always. Update only implies newer (more up-to-date). An update could degrade, or changing to an older version could be an upgrade.

== Hardware ==
Common hardware upgrades include additional memory and storage, and replacing the CPU and graphics card with faster components.

Updating hardware involves the risk of compatibility. For example, added RAM may not be compatible with existing RAM in a computer. Other hardware components may not be compatible after either an upgrade or downgrade, due to the non-availability of compatible drivers for the hardware with a specific operating system.

== Software ==
In order to upgrade software, a package is often downloaded over the Internet, sometimes directly by a user and sometimes automatically by a computer. The package may contain only the data needed to modify the existing version, not the entirety of the software. An upgrade may include improved functionality and bug fixes such as to eliminate a security vulnerability.

Common reasons to create a software upgrade package:

- Support industry regulatory requirements
- Access emerging technologies with new features, and tools
- Meet the demands of changing markets

Upgrading software involves the risk of introducing a bug into the software that might cause it to malfunction. For example, in October 2005, a glitch in a update caused trading on the Tokyo Stock Exchange to shut down for most of the day.

A software upgrade might result in incompatibility that causes hardware to stop functioning.

A change, considered an upgrade by some, may be considered a downgrade by others. A user may prefer a different version even if the so-called upgrade functions per design. The user might be accustomed to the other version or might miss removed features (see iPhone jack removal controversy or OtherOS).

A change, intended to upgrade, has the risk of bricking a device. This can happen for an embedded device in which updates are typically all-or-nothing, and which have limited ability to recover from a failed update. Solutions to this generally involve keeping multiple copies of firmware in device storage, so that one can be upgraded while the other remains intact as a fallback, but there are still holes which can cause this to fail. Tools such as Mender.io, Sysup, SWUpdate, RAUC, and OSTree provide solutions that implement upgrades in a safe atomic way, and reduce or eliminate the need to customize bootloaders and other components. Desktop systems are more likely to use something like snapshots or restore points; these are more efficient as they only require a small fraction of space to store the changes from the old system to the new one, but the lack of a turnkey implementation for embedded systems makes this impractical.

== See also ==
- Adaptation kit upgrade
- Advanced Packaging Tool – Free software package management system
- Macintosh Processor Upgrade Card – CPU upgrade card
- Patch (computing) – Data and process for mutating a software resource to a desired state
- Software update – Process of changing installed software to newer versions
- Source upgrade – Modification of source code via an asset
- Windows Anytime Upgrade – Discontinued service by Microsoft
- Yellow dog Updater, Modified – Free and open-source command-line package management utility
