= Collaborator (software) =

Code review software

- Developer(s): SmartBear Software
- Initial release: 2003 as Code Collaborator
- Stable release: 11.4 / September 26, 2018
- Operating system: Microsoft Windows, Linux, Mac, Solaris BSD
- Available in: English
- Type: Peer Code and Document Review
- License: Proprietary
- Website: smartbear.com/product/collaborator/overview/

Collaborator is a peer code review and document review software application by SmartBear Software, headquartered in Somerville, Massachusetts. This tool is used by teams to standardize their review process, reduce defects early, and speed up their development timelines. Companies in highly regulated industries like Automotive, Healthcare, Aerospace, Finance, and Embedded Systems also use the detailed review reports in Collaborator to meet compliance burdens.

== History ==
- Collaborator was originally named Code Collaborator as the original product of SmartBear software founded by Jason Cohen in 2003.
- Code Collaborator was the winner of the 2008 collaboration tools Jolt award.
- Cohen sold Smartbear in 2010 as part of a merger of three different companies Automated QA, Pragmatic Software and SmartBear.
