= Walter F. Tichy =

German computer scientist

- Born: 22 April 1952 (age 74); Bad Reichenhall, Germany
- Education: Technical University of Munich, Carnegie Mellon University
- Known for: RCS
- Awards: ACM Distinguished Member
- Scientific career
- Fields: Software engineering
- Workplaces: Karlsruhe Institute of Technology, Purdue University, Kutaisi International University
- Doctoral advisor: A. Nico Habermann

Walter F. Tichy (born 22 April 1952 in Bad Reichenhall) is a German computer scientist. He was professor of computer science at the Karlsruhe Institute of Technology in Germany where he taught classes in software engineering until April 2022. He remains at KIT as a professor emeritus and has been teaching at Kutaisi International University in Georgia since September 2022.

To the larger software development community he is best known as the initial developer of the RCS revision control system. However, he has also written highly cited works on experimental software engineering, the string-to-string correction problem, software configuration management, and extreme programming.

In 2010, he was elected an ACM Distinguished Member.
