= Kutaisi International University =

University in Kutaisi, Georgia

- ქუთაისის საერთაშორისო უნივერსიტეტი
- Type: Public
- Established: 2020; 6 years ago
- Chancellor: Levan Kopaliani
- President: Wolfgang A. Herrmann (honorary)
- Rector: Vakhtang Tsagareli
- Students: 1500+
- Location: Kutaisi, Imereti, Georgia; 42.206686°N 42.712603°E
- Campus: Rural
- Website: https://kiu.edu.ge/

- Location in Georgia Kutaisi International University (Imereti)

Kutaisi International University (Georgian: ქუთაისის საერთაშორისო უნივერსიტეტი, romanized: kutaisis saertashoriso universit'et'i, abbreviation: KIU) is a public research university in Kutaisi, Georgia. Its construction was announced on 12 September 2016 by Georgian prime minister Giorgi Kvirikashvili. The university will encompass over 158 hectares (390 acres) of land and will be designed for 60,000 students. The university opened officially on October 21, 2020 and offers educational programs leading to a Bachelor of Science in Management, Mathematics and Computer Science.

According to the Georgian Government it is planned that KIU will be the largest, regional education and research hub in the Caucasus with modern university campus.

Kutaisi International University is developed through strategic partnership with Technical University of Munich (TUM). Cooperation’s scope includes academic and research programs as well as in its organizational structure and development plan. In 2020, TUM has opened an office in Georgia to further strengthen and support its partnership with Kutaisi International University.

For 2021, KIU and TUM International intend to deepen their cooperation in particular in the field of technology transfer. TUM International Georgian office will help to develop the KIU campus into an international ecosystem for innovation and entrepreneurship. The office furthermore coordinates visits of scholars and lecturers to KIU and supports KIU’s outreach activities at national and international level. Like its TUM model, KIU will be building strong relationships with local and international companies to connect education, innovation and the labor market.

== Organization ==
As of 2025 Kutaisi International University offers ten English and/or Georgian-language education programs:

- Bachelor of Science in Management
- Bachelor of Science in Mathematics & Applications: Foundations of Artificial Intelligence, Scientific Computing, and Financial Mathematics
- Bachelor of Science in Computer Science
- Bachelor of Design
- Bachelor of Psychology
- Bachelor of Law
- Single-Cycle program in Medicine
- Master of Science in Finance and Information Management
- Master of Embedded Computing System
- Master of Intellectual Property, Innovations and Entrepreneurship
