= Virtual File System for Git =

Extension for Git version control system

VFS for Git
- Developer: Microsoft
- Stable release: 1.0.20210.1 / July 28, 2020; 6 years ago
- Preview release: 1.0.20175.6 / June 23, 2020; 6 years ago
- Written in: C++ and C#
- Operating system: Windows 10 Creators Update and later, macOS
- Type: Virtual file system for Git
- License: MIT License
- Website: github.com/microsoft/VFSForGit?tab=readme-ov-file#readme
- Repository: github.com/Microsoft/VFSForGit

Virtual File System for Git (VFS for Git), developed by Microsoft, is an extension to the Git version control system.

== Overview ==
VFS for Git is designed to ease the handling of enterprise-scale Git repositories, such as the Microsoft Windows operating system (whose development switched to Git under Microsoft's internal "One Engineering System" initiative). The system exposes a virtual file system that only downloads files to local storage as they are needed.

== History ==
VFS for Git was originally named Git Virtual File System (GVFS). However due to complaints by the developers of GNOME over confusion with GNOME Virtual File System, Microsoft announced that it would solicit ideas for a new name of the software in June 2018, following its acquisition of GitHub. Its first release under the new name was in August 2018.

In November 2017, GitHub announced that it would support VFS for Git.

VFS for Git has been superseded by Scalar. Scalar was then integrated into the Microsoft Git project.

== See also ==
- Version control
