= Committer =

Individual permitted to modify the source code of a software project

A committer is an individual who is permitted to modify the source code of a software project, that will be used in the project's official releases. To contribute source code to most large software projects, one must make modifications and then "commit" those changes to a central version control system.

In open-source software development, the committer role may be used to distinguish commit access, a specific type of responsibility, from other forms of contribution, such as triaging issues or organizing events. Typically, an author submits a software patch containing changes and a committer integrates the patch into the main code base of the project.

== Commit bit ==
To have a "commit bit" on one's user account means that the user is permitted to contribute source code changes. This dates to the use of a literal binary digit to represent yes-or-no privileges in access control systems of legacy version control and software systems, such as BSD. The commit bit represents the permission to contribute to the shared code of a software project. It can be resigned or may be removed due to inactivity in the project, as dormant committer accounts can represent security risks.
