= Source upgrade =

Modification of source code via an asset

A source upgrade is a software distribution for upgrading source code from one version to another, and it is the process of using the distribution to upgrade a codebase. The upgrade might add new features, improve performance and stability, or fix bugs in the code.

The term applies to general software development, but is more prevalent in the sub-context of game development. A relatively small upgrade that focuses on bug fixes might be classified as a patch. A large upgrade that allows older software to run on a different platform might be classified as a source port. An update created for a video game by users (not the original developers or maintainers) might be classified as a mod.

== See also ==
- Backward compatibility
- Doom source ports
- Source-code compatibility
- ZDoom
