= Marc Rochkind =

American computer scientist

Marc J. Rochkind
- Born: Marc J. Rochkind; 12 June 1948 (age 78)
- Education: University of Maryland, Rutgers University
- Occupations: Software engineer, Author
- Known for: Source Code Control System
- Website: www.mrochkind.com/mrochkind/index.html

Marc J. Rochkind (born 12 June 1948, in Baltimore) invented the Source Code Control System while working at Bell Labs, as well as writing Advanced UNIX Programming, and founding XVT Software, Inc.
