= Larry McVoy =

American computer programmer

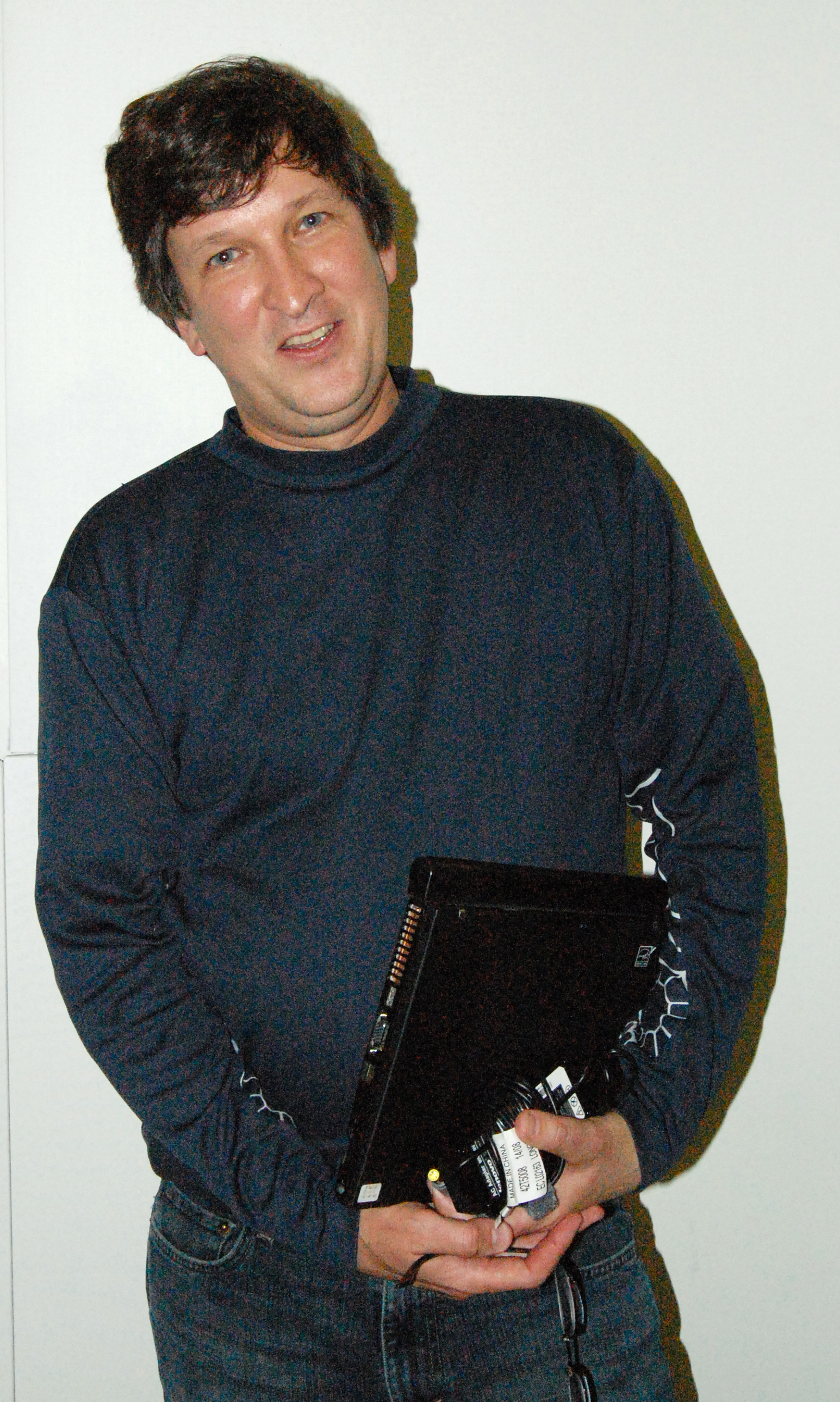
Larry McVoy

Larry McVoy (born 1962 in Concord, Massachusetts, United States) is the former CEO of BitMover, the company that made BitKeeper, a version control system that was used from February 2002 to early 2005 to manage the source code of the Linux kernel.

He earned BS and MS degrees in computer science in 1985 and 1987, respectively, from the University of Wisconsin–Madison and has been employed by Sun Microsystems and Silicon Graphics. His work generally included performance enhancements to the various Unix operating systems developed by his employers. While McVoy worked at Sun, he worked on a peer-to-peer SCM system named TeamWare that would form the basis of his later BitKeeper product.

== Linux ==
McVoy started working with the Linux kernel around its 0.97 version (1992) and developed the LMbench kernel benchmark. LMbench was maintained until 2009 by Carl Staelin.

The BitKeeper source control system was also developed and integrated into the Linux development process in 2002, but after McVoy decided to charge for the use of BitKeeper, the Linux development community prompted the development of the Git tool that began serving as the source control system for the Linux kernel in 2005. As a response to McVoy's decision to charge the Linux development team, Richard Stallman wrote the satirically titled essay "Thank you, Larry McVoy." In this essay, Stallman thanks McVoy for inadvertently strengthening the case for adopting free and open-source software more generally as to avoid similar scenarios to BitKeeper in the future.

== Sourceware Operating System ==
While working at Sun in the early 1990s, McVoy and a number of other high-profile Unix community members urged the company to open-source their flagship Unix product, SunOS, in cooperation with Novell, to compete with Microsoft's new Windows NT operating system. The proposal would have involved creating a copyleft version of SunOS at a time before Linux had reached its 1.0 version. McVoy predicted (accurately) that Linux would displace Unix if the companies didn't do so.

== Bibliography ==
- McVoy, L.; Kleiman, S. (1991). Extent-like Performance from a UNIX File System. Proceedings of the 1991 Winter USENIX Conference. pp. 33–44. CiteSeerX 10.1.1.160.2196.
