= BitKeeper =

Proprietary software tool for distributed revision control of computer source code

- Original author: BitMover Inc.
- Release: May 4, 2000; 26 years ago
- Final release: 7.3.3 / December 29, 2018; 7 years ago
- Written in: C
- Operating system: AIX, FreeBSD, HP-UX, IRIX, Linux, Mac OS X, NetBSD, OpenBSD, Solaris, Windows
- Type: Distributed revision control
- License: 2016: Apache-2.0 (Note: Apache-2.0 since 2016-05-09.); 2000: Proprietary (Note: Proprietary from 2000 until 2016-05-09.)
- Website: www.bitkeeper.org
- Repository: github.com/bitkeeper-scm/bitkeeper

BitKeeper is a discontinued software tool for distributed revision control of computer source code. Originally developed as proprietary software by BitMover Inc., a privately held company based in Los Gatos, California, it was released as open-source software under the Apache-2.0 license on 9 May 2016. BitKeeper is no longer being developed.

== History ==
BitKeeper was originally developed by BitMover Inc., a privately held company from Los Gatos, California owned by Larry McVoy, who had previously designed TeamWare.

=== BitKeeper and the Linux kernel ===
BitKeeper was first mentioned as a solution to some of the growing pains that Linux was having in September 1998. Early access betas were available in May 1999 and on May 4, 2000, the first public release of BitKeeper was made available. BitMover used to provide access to the system for certain open-source or free-software projects, one of which was the source code of the Linux kernel. The license for the "community" version of BitKeeper had allowed for developers to use the tool at no cost for open source or free software projects, provided those developers did not participate in the development of a competing tool (such as Concurrent Versions System, GNU arch, Subversion or IBM DevOps Code ClearCase) for the duration of their usage of BitKeeper. This restriction applied regardless of whether the competing tool was free or proprietary. This version of BitKeeper also required that certain meta-information about changes be stored on computer servers operated by BitMover, an addition that made it impossible for community version users to run projects of which BitMover was unaware.

The decision made in 2002 to use BitKeeper for Linux kernel development was a controversial one. Some, including GNU Project founder Richard Stallman, expressed concern about proprietary tools being used on a flagship free project. While project leader Linus Torvalds and other core developers adopted BitKeeper, several key developers (including Linux veteran Alan Cox) refused to do so, citing the BitMover license, and voicing concern that the project was ceding some control to a proprietary developer. To mitigate these concerns, BitMover added gateways which allowed limited interoperation between the Linux BitKeeper servers (maintained by BitMover) and developers using CVS and Subversion. Even after this addition, flamewars occasionally broke out on the Linux kernel mailing list, often involving key kernel developers and BitMover's CEO Larry McVoy, who was also a Linux contributor.

In April 2005, BitMover announced that it would stop providing a version of BitKeeper free of charge to the community, giving as the reason the efforts of Andrew Tridgell, a developer employed by OSDL on an unrelated project, to develop a client which would show the metadata (data about revisions, possibly including differences between versions) instead of only the most recent version. Being able to see metadata and compare past versions is one of the core features of all version-control systems, but was not available to anyone without a commercial BitKeeper license, significantly inconveniencing most Linux kernel developers. Although BitMover decided to provide free commercial BitKeeper licenses to some kernel developers, it refused to give or sell licenses to anyone employed by OSDL, including Linus Torvalds and Andrew Morton, placing OSDL developers in the same position as other kernel developers. The Git project was launched with the intent of becoming the Linux kernel's source code management software, and was eventually adopted by Linux developers.

End of support for the "Free Use" version of BitKeeper was officially July 1, 2005, and users were required to switch to the commercial version or change version control system by then. Commercial users were also required not to produce any competing tools: In October 2005, McVoy contacted a customer using commercially licensed BitKeeper, demanding that an employee of the customer stop contributing to the GPL-licensed Mercurial source management tool. Bryan O'Sullivan, the employee, responded, "To avoid any possible perception of conflict, I have volunteered to Larry that as long as I continue to use the commercial version of BitKeeper, I will not contribute to the development of Mercurial."

=== Move to open-source ===
During the release of version 7.2ce at May 9, 2016, BitKeeper announced that it is starting to move from a proprietary to an open-source license, eventually releasing the software under the Apache License version 2.

== See also ==
- List of version-control software
