= Comparison of version-control software =

The following tables describe attributes of notable version control and software configuration management (SCM) systems that can be used to compare and contrast the various systems.

For SCM software not suitable for source code, see Comparison of open-source configuration management software.

== General information ==
The following table contains relatively general attributes of version-control software systems, including:

- Repository model, the relationship between copies of the source code repository
  - Client–server, users access a master repository via a client; typically, their local machines hold only a working copy of a project tree. Changes in one working copy must be committed to the master repository before they are propagated to other users.
  - Distributed, repositories act as peers, and users typically have a local repository with version history available, in addition to their working copies.
- Concurrency model, how changes to the working copy are managed to prevent simultaneous edits from causing nonsensical data in the repository.
  - Lock, changes are disallowed until the user requests and receives an exclusive lock on the file from the master repository.
  - Merge, users may freely edit files, but are informed of possible conflicts upon checking their changes into the repository, whereupon the version control system may merge changes on both sides, or let the user decide when conflicts arise. Distributed version control systems usually use a merge concurrency model.

Software	Maintainer	Development status	Repository model	Concurrency model	License	Supported platforms	Financial cost
AccuRev SCM	Micro Focus	Discontinued, merged with Dimensions CM	Client–server	Merge or lock	Proprietary	Most Java Platforms (Unix-like, Windows, macOS)	$350 per seat, quoted on an individual basis.
Azure DevOps	Microsoft	Active	Client–server, Distributed	Merge or lock	Proprietary	Windows, cross-platform via Azure DevOps Services	Free for up to 5 users in the Azure DevOps Services or for open source projects; else at cost, licensed through MSDN subscription or direct buy.
GNU Bazaar	Canonical	Unmaintained, forked as Breezy	Distributed and Client–server	Merge	GPL-2.0-or-later	Unix-like, Windows, macOS	Free
BitKeeper	BitMover Inc.	Unmaintained	Distributed	Merge	Apache-2.0	Unix-like, Windows, macOS	Free
IBM DevOps Code ClearCase	IBM	Active	Client–server	Merge or lock (Note: In ClearCase, a trigger may be set to allow for the lock model, and this is done at many sites. However, ClearCase development usually takes place on private branches where each developer is given their own branch, so the lock vs. merge concurrency model doesn't matter as much. Code is merged back to the main branch once the developer is ready to deliver their code to the project.)	Proprietary	Linux, Windows, AIX, Solaris, HP UX, IBM i, OS/390, z/OS,	$4600 per floating license (held automatically for 30 minutes minimum per user, can be surrendered manually)
Code Co-op	Reliable Software	Discontinued	Distributed	Merge	MIT	Windows	$150 per seat
Concurrent Versions System	The CVS Team	Unmaintained	Client–server	Merge	GPL-1.0-or-later	Unix-like, Windows, macOS	Free
CVSNT	March Hare Software and community members	Unmaintained	Client–server	Merge or lock	GPL or proprietary	Unix-like, Windows, macOS, IBM i	£425 distribution fee for older version or £85 commercial license for latest version of CVS Suite or Change Management Server
darcs	The Darcs team	Active	Distributed	Merge	GPL-2.0-or-later	Unix-like, Windows, macOS	Free
Dat	The Dat team	Unmaintained	Distributed	Merge	BSD-3-Clause	Unix-like, Windows, macOS	Free
Dimensions CM	OpenText	Active	Client–server	Merge or lock	Proprietary	Windows, Linux, Solaris, AIX, HP UX, z/OS	Paid
Fossil	D. Richard Hipp	Active	Distributed	Merge	BSD-2-Clause	POSIX, Windows, macOS, Other	Free
Git	Junio Hamano	Active	Distributed	Merge	GPL-2.0-only	POSIX, Windows, macOS, Linux	Free
GNU arch	Andy Tai	Unmaintained	Distributed	Merge	GPL	Unix-like, Windows, macOS	Free
IC Manage	IC Manage Inc.	Active	Client–server	Merge or lock	Proprietary	Unix-like, Windows, macOS	Paid
PTC Integrity	PTC	Discontinued	Client–server	Merge or lock	Proprietary	Unix-like, Windows	Paid
Mercurial	Mercurial Community	Active	Distributed	Merge	GPL-2.0-or-later	Unix-like, Windows, macOS	Free
Microsoft Visual SourceSafe	Microsoft	Discontinued	Shared Folder	Merge or lock	Proprietary	Windows	$500 per license approximately, or single license included with each MSDN subscription.
Monotone	Nathaniel Smith, Graydon Hoare	Unmaintained	Distributed	Merge	GPL-2.0-or-later	Unix-like, Windows, macOS	Free
Perforce P4	Perforce	Active	Client–server and Distributed	Merge or lock	Proprietary	Unix-like, Windows, macOS	Available as perpetual license and subscriptions; prices vary based on configurations and options
PVCS	OpenText	Discontinued, merged with Dimensions CM	Client–server	Lock	Proprietary	Windows, Unix-like	Paid
IBM Rational Team Concert	IBM	Discontinued	Client–server (Note: RTC is not a distributed revision control system; but has some distributed feature that can be configured)	Merge or lock	Proprietary	Linux, Windows, AIX, Solaris, HP UX, IBM i, OS/390, z/OS, macOS	Free for up to 10 users, else paid
Rational Synergy	IBM	Active	Client–server and Distributed	Merge or lock	Proprietary	Linux, Windows, Unix-like	Paid
Revision Control System	Thien-Thi Nguyen	Unmaintained	Local	Merge or lock	GPL-3.0-or-later	Unix-like	Free
Source Code Control System	Jörg Schilling (Note: Various forks of the original Unix sources exist, only one of which is actively maintained)	Unmaintained	Local	Lock (Note: While it is possible for multiple users to edit the same version of a file concurrently, only one of them can write back the changes.)	CDDL – proprietary (Note: While some forks of SCCS are free software, others remain closed as parts of commercial Unix distributions.)	Unix-like, macOS	Free CDDL-licensed versions or paid in some UNIX distributions.
StarTeam	Borland (Micro Focus)	Discontinued	Client–server	Merge or lock	Proprietary	Windows and Cross-platform via Java based client	Paid
Subversion	Apache Software Foundation	Active	Client–server	Merge or lock (Note: In Subversion, a file attribute enables the lock model on per-file basis. This file attribute can be set automatically using file name wildcard expressions.)	Apache-2.0	Unix-like, Windows, macOS	Free
Surround SCM	Perforce	Unmaintained	Client–server	Merge or lock	Proprietary	Linux, Windows, macOS	$595 per user; $29/month subscription
Unity Version Control	Unity Technologies	Active	Client–server and Distributed	Merge or lock	Proprietary	Linux, Windows, macOS	Free for up to 3 users, else starting at $7 per user per month for server-hosted, or $23 per user per month for on-premises edition. No perpetual licenses.
Vault	SourceGear LLC	Active	Client–server	Merge or lock	Proprietary	Unix-like, Linux, Windows	$300 per user
Vesta	Compaq	Discontinued	Distributed NFS-protocol-emulation choice to optionally confederate clients and/or servers	Lock on branch; merge branch-to-branch	LGPL	Tru64, Linux	Free
Software	Maintainer	Development status	Repository model	Concurrency model	License	Supported platforms	Financial cost

== Technical information ==
The following table shows technical details of some well-known version-control software. These are classified based on the following headers:

Table explanation

- Software: The name of the application that is described.
- Programming language: The coding language in which the application is being developed
- Storage Method: Describes the form in which files are stored in the repository. A snapshot indicates that a committed file(s) is stored in its entirety—usually compressed. A changeset, in this context, indicates that a committed file(s) is stored in the form of a difference between either the previous version or the next.
- Scope of change: Describes whether changes are recorded for individual files or for entire directory trees.
- Revision IDs: are used internally to identify specific versions of files in the repository. Systems may use pseudorandom identifiers, content hashes of revisions, or filenames with sequential version numbers (namespace). With Integrated Difference, revisions are based on the Changesets themselves, which can describe changes to more than one file.
- Network protocols: lists the protocols used for synchronization of changes.
- Source code size: Gives the size of the source code in megabytes.

Software	Programming language	Storage method	Scope of change	Revision IDs	Network protocols	Source code size
AccuRev SCM	C++, Java	Changeset	File	Number pair NN/NN	custom	Unknown
Azure DevOps	C++ and C#	Changeset	File and Tree	Numbers	SOAP over HTTP or HTTPS, SSH	Unknown
GNU Bazaar	Python 2, Pyrex (optional), C (Note: Bazaar's critical modules are written in Pyrex. They are automatically translated to pure C; except for the patience sorting module, used in merge resolution, which is written directly in the C language.)	Snapshot	Tree	Pseudorandom	custom, custom over SSH, custom over HTTP, HTTP, SFTP, FTP, email bundles, (Note: A Bazaar bundle is a summary diff, with sufficient extra information to preserve history.) WebDAV (with plugin)	4.1 MB
BitKeeper	C	Changeset	Tree	Changeset keys, numbers	custom, HTTP, rsh, SSH, email	99 MB
CA Software Change Manager	C, C++, Java, HTML	Changeset and Snapshot	File and Tree	Numbers	HTTP, TCP/IP	Unknown
IBM DevOps Code ClearCase	C, Java, Perl	Changeset	File and Tree	Numbers	custom (CCFS), custom (MVFS filesystem driver), HTTP	Unknown
Code Co-op	C++	Changeset	Unknown	User ID-Ordinal	e-mail (MAPI, SMTP/POP3, Gmail), LAN	Unknown
CVS	C	Changeset	File	Numbers	pserver, SSH	10.3 MB
CVSNT	C++	Changeset	File and Tree	Numbers	custom over SSH, sspi, sserver, gserver, pserver	55 MB
darcs	Haskell	Changeset (Patch) (Note: Snapshots with binary files. It's discussed to have binary changesets in future (darcs 3))	Tree	n/a	custom over SSH, HTTP, email	1.7 MB
Dimensions CM	C, C++, Java, C#	Snapshot or changeset	File and Tree	Numbers	Custom, HTTP/HTTPS	Unknown
Fossil	C	Snapshot or changeset	Tree	SHA-1 or SHA-3 hashes	HTTP/HTTPS, custom over SSH	7.2 MB (Note: 4 MB of which are sqlite3.c)
Git	C, shell scripts, Perl	Snapshot	Tree	SHA-1 or SHA-256 hashes	custom (git), custom over SSH, HTTP/HTTPS, rsync, email, bundles	23 MB
GNU arch	C, shell scripts	Changeset	Tree	Numbers	HTTP, WebDAV	Unknown
IC Manage	C++, C	Changeset	Unknown	Numbers	custom	Unknown
Mercurial	Python, C	Changeset	Tree	Numbers, (Note: Mercurial revision numbers are local to a repository; they can differ from repository to repository depending on in which order merges are performed.) SHA-1 hashes	custom over SSH, HTTP, email bundles (with standard plugin)	20 MB
MKS Integrity	C, Java	Changeset	File	Numbers	custom, HTTP	Unknown
Monotone	C++	Hybrid (Note: A Monotone's revisions represent changesets and its manifests represent snapshots, each revision is linked to some manifest. But manifests are legacy constructs, they aren't kept in the database anymore and reconstructed on the fly if needed. The real work now happen in rosters which are hybrid snapshot/changeset structures.)	Tree	SHA-1 hashes	custom (netsync), custom over SSH, file system	4.4 MB
Perforce Helix Core	C++, C	Changeset	Tree	Numbers	custom	Unknown
PVCS	C++, C	Changeset	File	Numbers	Unknown	Unknown
Rational Team Concert	Java	Changeset	Tree	Numbers	REST services over HTTP/HTTPS	Unknown
Revision Control System	C	Changeset	File	Numbers	File system	5.3 MB
Source Code Control System	C	Changeset	File	Numbers	NFS	1.3 MB
StarTeam	C++, C, Java	Snapshot	File and Tree	MD5 hashes	custom, TCP/IP	Unknown
Subversion	C	Changeset and Snapshot	Tree	Numbers	custom (svn), custom over SSH, HTTP and SSL (using WebDAV)	41 MB
Surround SCM	C++	Changeset	File and Tree	Numbers	TCP/IP	Unknown
Synergy	Java	Changeset (text), Snapshot(binary)	File	Numbers	custom, custom over SSH, HTTP	Unknown
Vault	C#	Changeset	File and Tree	Numbers	HTTP, HTTPS	Unknown
Vesta	C++	Snapshot	Tree	Unknown	NFS	15.8 MB
Visual SourceSafe	C	Snapshot	File	Numbers	SMB, DCOM	Unknown
Software	Programming language	Storage method	Scope of change	Revision IDs	Network protocols	Source code size

== Features ==
The following table classifies some well-known software on the basis of its features and capabilities:

Table explanation

- Software: The name of the application that is described.
- Supports Git data format: able to natively work on Git's repository formats
- Atomic commits: refers to a guarantee that all changes are made, or that no change at all will be made.
- File renames: describes whether a system allows files to be renamed while retaining their version history.
- Merge file renames: describes whether a system can merge changes made to a file on one branch into the same file that has been renamed on another branch (or vice versa). If the same file has been renamed on both branches then there is a rename conflict that the user must resolve.
- Symbolic links: describes whether a system allows revision control of symbolic links as with regular files. Versioning symbolic links is considered by some people a feature and some people a security breach (e.g., a symbolic link to /etc/passwd). Symbolic links are only supported on select platforms, depending on the software.
- Pre-/post-event hooks: indicates the capability to trigger commands before or after an action, such as a commit, takes place.
- Signed revisions: refers to integrated digital signing of revisions, in a format such as OpenPGP.
- Merge tracking: describes whether a system remembers what changes have been merged between which branches and only merges the changes that are missing when merging one branch into another.
- End of line conversions: describes whether a system can adapt the end of line characters for text files such that they match the end of line style for the operating system under which it is used. The granularity of control varies. Subversion, for example, can be configured to handle EOLs differently according to the file type, whereas Perforce converts all text files according to a single, per-client setting.
- Tags: indicates if meaningful names can be given to specific revisions, regardless of whether these names are called tags or labels.
- International support: indicates if the software has support for multiple language environments and operating system
- Unicode filename support: indicates if the software has support for interoperations under file systems using different character encodings.
- Supports large repos: Can the system handle repositories of around a gigabyte or larger effectively?

Software	Supports Git data format	Atomic commits	File renames	Merge file renames	Symbolic links	Pre-/post-event hooks	Signed revisions	Merge tracking	End of line conversions	Tags	International support	Unicode filename support	Supports large repos
AccuRev SCM		Yes	Yes	Partial (Note: Evil twins are common.Evil Twins in SCM, Not Hollywood)	Yes	Yes	Yes	Yes	Yes	—N/a	Yes	Yes	Yes
Azure DevOps	Yes	Yes	Yes	Yes	Yes	Yes	No	Yes	Yes	Yes	Yes	Yes	Yes
GNU Bazaar		Yes	Yes	Yes	Yes	Yes	Yes	Yes	Yes	Yes	Yes	Yes	Unknown
BitKeeper		Yes	Yes	Yes	Yes	Yes	Unknown	Yes	Yes	Yes	Unknown	Unknown	Yes
CA Software Change Manager		Yes	Yes	Yes	Yes	Yes	Yes	Yes	Yes	Yes	Yes	Yes	Unknown
IBM DevOps Code ClearCase		Partial (Note: Atomic commit can be enabled for individual checkin's ClearCase 7.1.1 release notes.)	Yes	Yes	Yes	Yes	Yes	Yes	Yes	Yes	Yes	Unknown	Yes
Code Co-op		Yes	Yes	Yes	No	Partial	No	No	No	Yes	Unknown	Unknown	Unknown
CVS	No	No	No	No	No	Partial	No	No	Yes	Yes	Unknown	No	Yes
CVSNT	No	Yes	Yes	Yes	Yes	Yes	No	Yes	Yes	Yes	Yes	Yes	Yes
darcs		Yes	Yes	Yes	No (Note: See FAQ)	Yes	Yes	—N/a (Note: darcs' patches each bear a unique identifier, impossible to merge twice the same patch in a repository (without destructively modifying history using "unsafe" commands).)	No	Yes	No	Yes (Note: Although it stores (and shows by default) 8-bit filename. See FAQ)	Unknown
Dimensions CM		Yes	Yes	Yes	No	Yes	Unknown	Yes	Yes	Yes (Note: Using Item Revision Attributes ("Working with Items" demo, covering user define attributes).)	No (Note: In the sense that its messages and graphic interfaces have English only localization, though the software is certified running fine on various language operating systems.)	Yes	Yes
Fossil		Yes	Yes	Yes	Yes	Yes	Yes	Yes	Yes (Note: Controlled by the 'crnl-glob' setting ())	Yes	Yes	Yes	Yes
Git	Yes	Yes	Partial (Note: Git does not explicitly track renames, because by design it does not track individual files. Renames and split of source files are detected after the fact, if the file content does not change dramatically.)	Yes	Yes	Yes	Yes (Note: Since git-1.7.9 (see release notes). Older versions do not sign commits, only tags (see the -s option in git-tag(1) Manual page))	Yes	Yes	Yes	Yes	Yes (Note: UTF-8 filenames are supported as of version 1.7.10 (MSysGit release notes).)	Partial (Note: Git has some issues with very large repositories. See Section Better big-file support and Section Designing a faster index format in SoC 2012 Ideas.)
GNU arch		Yes	Yes	Unknown	Yes	Yes	Yes	Unknown	Unknown	Yes	Unknown	Unknown	Unknown
IC Manage		Yes	Yes	No	Yes	Yes	Yes	Yes	Yes	Yes	Yes	Unknown	Unknown
MKS Integrity		Yes	Yes	Yes	No	Yes	Yes (Note: Integrity enabled change packages provide complete workflow and 21 CFR Part 11 compliant digital signatures against the item controlling the change package.)	Yes (Note: 2009 SP5 added a feature to merge child development paths.)	Yes	Yes	Yes	Yes	Unknown
Mercurial	Partial	Yes	Yes	Yes	Yes	Yes	Yes	Yes	Yes	Yes	Yes (Note: Mercurial includes internationalization for more than 10 languages as of 2017.)	Partial (Note: Support depends upon host OS and is well supported under Unix, but not Windows OSs, due to lack of host support. See)	Yes
Monotone		Yes	Yes	Yes	No (Note: It could be done via user level hooks)	Yes	Yes, mandatory	Yes	Yes	Yes	Unknown	Yes	Unknown
Perforce Helix Core		Yes	Yes	Yes	Partial (Note: Perforce will version-control symbolic links themselves, but will not recognise its own version-controlled views (local file trees), if you access them via symbolic links.)	Yes	No	Yes	Yes	Yes	Yes	Yes	Yes
Rational Team Concert		Yes	Yes	Yes	Yes	Yes (Note: Through the process behaviour components: Operation advisors and Operation participants. https://jazz.net/library/article/292)	Yes	Yes	Yes	Yes	Yes	Yes	Unknown
Source Code Control System	No	Yes	No	—N/a	—N/a	No	No	Yes	No	No	Partial (Note: While the source code of SCCS has been written to support internationalisation, only English message texts exist.)	Yes	Yes
StarTeam		Yes (Note: StarTeam supports atomic commits as of version 2006)	Yes	Unknown	Yes	No	No	Yes	Yes	Yes	Yes	Unknown	Yes
Subversion	No	Yes	Yes (Note: Subversion can move a file and conserve its history, if and only if the target of the move is in the same Subversion repository as the source. Cross-repository moves require third-party tools.)	Partial (Note: Since SVN 1.8 subversion supports improved move-tracking on the client side. On the server-side it's not supported yet.)	Yes	Yes	No	Yes. (Note: New to SVN 1.5 <http://subversion.apache.org/docs/release-notes/1.5.html#merge-tracking>. A separate tool "svnmerge" <> provides merge tracking for older versions.)	Yes	Partial (Note: In Subversion, tags are a special case of the more generic "cheap copy" concept of Subversion. Per convention, a tag is a copy into a directory named "tags". Because of this, even tags are versioned. See https://svnbook.red-bean.com/nightly/en/svn.branchmerge.tags.html for more information. The reason for partial support in the table is because Subversion's emulation of tags in this manner does not meet the requirement that the tag name can be used in place of any revision identifier wherever the user may be required to enter one. This column would be meaningless if the definition were to be loosened enough to encompass Subversion's approach as every version control system supports branching and would therefore support tags as well.)	Yes	Yes	Yes
Surround SCM		Yes	Yes	Yes	Yes	Yes	Yes	Yes	Yes	Yes	Yes	Yes	Yes
Synergy		Yes	Yes	Yes	Yes	Yes	Yes	Yes	Yes	Yes	Yes	Yes (Note: in Asian releases (v6.6a to v7.1a) and since version 7.2 in general)	Yes
Vault		Yes	Yes	Yes	No	Yes	No	No	Yes	Yes	Unknown	Unknown	Unknown
Vesta		Yes	Yes	Unknown	Unknown	Yes	No	No	No	Yes	No	Unknown	Yes
Visual SourceSafe		No	No (Note: Version change history is removed upon rename; old name not referenced.)	Unknown	No	Yes	No	No	Unknown	Yes	Yes	Unknown	Unknown
Software		Atomic commits	File renames	Merge file renames	Symbolic links	Pre-/post-event hooks	Signed revisions	Merge tracking	End of line conversions	Tags	International support	Unicode filename support	Supports large repos

== Advanced features ==
The following are some more advanced features and capabilities available in notable version-control systems:

Table explanation

- Keyword expansion: supports automatic expansion of keywords such as file revision number.
- Interactive commits: interactive commits allow the user to cherrypick common lines of code used to anchor files (patch-hunks) that become part of a commit (leaving unselected changes as changes in the working copy), instead of having only a file-level granularity.
- External references: embedding of foreign repositories in the source tree
- Partial checkout/clone: ability to check out or clone only a specified subdirectory from a repository.
- Permissions: tracks file permission bits in the revision history.
- Timestamp preservation: overwrites the last modified filesystem attribute with the commit time upon checkout.
- Custom automatic merge tool: automatic merging can be attempted by any tool of the user's choice (hopefully configurable on a per-file basis)
- Supported formats: either read/write support or read-only (conversion, potentially repeated)
- Shared build cache of derived objects: the ability to automatically substitute (wink-in) derived-objects that were built by other confederated clients that share exactly the same dependencies instead of rebuilding them locally

Software	Keyword expansion	Interactive commits	External references	Partial checkout/clone	Permissions	Timestamp preservation	Custom automatic merge tool	Supported formats	Shared build cache of derived objects
AccuRev SCM	Yes	Unknown	Yes	Yes	execution bit only	Yes	Yes	git (bi-dir)	No
Azure DevOps	No	Yes	Unknown	Yes	Yes	Unknown	Yes	Unknown	Unknown
GNU Bazaar	Yes	Yes	Yes	No	execution bit only	No (Note: not implemented yet)	Yes	bzr, subversion, git, hg, any that has a fastexporter	No
BitKeeper	POSIX and RCS	Yes	Yes	Yes	Yes	Yes	Yes	bitkeeper	No
CA Software Change Manager	No	Yes	No	Yes	execution bit only	Yes	Yes	CA Software Change Manager	No
IBM DevOps Code ClearCase	Yes	No	No	Yes	Yes	Yes (Note: Can not be disabled in dynamic views.)	Yes	ClearCase	Yes
CVS	RCS	No	Yes	Yes (Note: Using alias of the CVSROOT/modules file.)	Partial (Note: CVS records executable bit when a file is added, but does not allow changing it later on.)	Yes	No	cvs	No
CVSNT	RCS	Yes (Note: This is a GUI feature supported by TortoiseCVS and WinCVS both of which include/use CVSNT.)	Yes (Note: Same as CVS, plus also the ability to have replicated repositories including 'shadow' repositories.)	Yes (Note: Use the module/directory name or an alias created using CVSROOT/modules or CVSROOT/modules2 administration file.)	Yes	Yes	No	cvs	Yes (Note: CVSNT supports this when the make/build tool used also supports it.)
darcs	No	Yes	No	No (Note: Darcs can do sparse checkouts from explicit checkpoints on darcs-1 repositories, but not from darcs-2 ones)	Partial (Note: Darcs can automatically detect #! scripts and make them executable on checkout.)	No	conflicts only	darcs	No
Dimensions CM	Yes	No	Yes (Note: Using Sub Project functionality (Documentation Portfolio | User's Guide | Relating a Project or Stream to Other Objects).)	Yes	Yes	Yes	Yes	Migration from ClearCase, Subversion, CVS, PVCS, ChangeMan DS	Unknown
Fossil	No	Yes	Yes (Note: Checkouts can be nested with "fossil open –nested")	No	execution bit only	No	No	fossil (uses sqlite), any that has a fastexporter; migration from git and svn	No
Git	Yes (Note: The Git FAQ states that keyword expansion is not a good thing)	Yes (Note: add -i and add -p, see git-add(1) Manual Page)	Yes	Yes	execution bit only	No (Note: The Git FAQ explains why preserving modification time is considered harmful)	Yes	git, cvs, subversion, hg, any that has a fastexporter	No
Mercurial	Yes	Yes	Yes	Yes	execution bit only	through (alpha) extension	Yes	hg, subversion, lossless two-way push to and pull from git, migration from any other format supported by the Convert extension: CVS, Darcs, Bazaar, Monotone, GNU Arch, and Perforce	No
Perforce Helix Core	Yes	No	No	Yes	Yes	Yes	Yes	Perforce	No
Rational Team Concert	No	Yes	Yes	Yes	Yes	Unknown	Yes	—N/a	No
Source Code Control System	Yes	No	—N/a	Yes	execution bit only	some variants	No	sccs	No
Surround SCM	Yes	No	No	Yes	No	Yes	Yes (Note: Configurable on server as a Project Option and on the client as a User Option.)	Surround	No
Subversion	Yes	Partial (Note: Through third-party tools such as Tortoise SVN.)	Yes	Yes	execution bit only	Partial (Note: SVN can not preserve file modification times. On request by the client, it can restore check-in time as last-modified time. Disabled by default.)	Yes (Note: MIME type of the file must be detected as a "human-readable" MIME type, even if the merge tool can work with non-human-readable files)	subversion	No
Vesta	No	No	Yes via SDL	No	Unknown	Yes	No	Vesta	Yes
Visual SourceSafe	Yes	Unknown	Unknown	Yes	Yes	Unknown	Yes	Unknown	No
Software	Keyword expansion	Interactive commits	External references	Partial checkout/clone	Permissions	Timestamp preservation	Custom automatic merge tool	Supported formats	Shared build cache of derived objects

== Basic commands ==
The following table provides further information about commands available in notable version-control systems.

Table explanation

- Repository init: Create a new empty repository (i.e., version control database)
- clone: Create an identical instance of a repository (in a safe transaction)
- pull: Download revisions from a remote repository to a local repository
- push: Upload revisions from a local repository to a remote repository
- Local branches: Create a local branch that does not exist in the original remote repository
- checkout: Create a local working copy from a (remote) repository
- update: Update the files in a working copy with the latest version from a repository
- lock: Lock files in a repository from being changed by other users
- add: Mark specified files to be added to repository at next commit
- remove: Mark specified files to be removed at next commit (note: keeps cohesive revision history of before and at the remove.)
- move: Mark specified files to be moved to a new location at next commit
- copy: Mark specified files to be copied at next commit
- merge: Apply the differences between two sources to a working copy path
- commit: Record changes in the repository
- revert: Restore working copy file from repository
- generate bundle file: Create a file that contains a compressed set of changes to a given repository
- rebase: Forward-port local commits to the updated upstream head
- Note: Commands in green rectangles that are not surrounded by [square brackets] are at an interactive command-line prompt. Text in [square brackets] is an explanation of where to find equivalent functionality.

Software	Repository init	clone	pull	push	Local branches	checkout	update	lock	add	remove	move	copy	merge	commit	revert	generate bundle file	rebase
AccuRev SCM	mkdepot	N/A	N/A	N/A	mkstream	mkws	update	anchor	add	defunct	move	cp [then] add – incl -s – ln	merge	keep – promote	purge – revert	N/A	chstream
Azure DevOps	using Git	clone using Git	get	commit	shelveset	checkout	get	lock	add	delete	rename	using Git	merge	commit	undo	using Git	get
GNU Bazaar	init – init -no-tree – init-repo – init-repo -no-trees	branch – branch -no-tree	pull	push	init – branch	checkout – checkout -lightweight	update	N/A	add	rm	mv	N/A	merge	commit	revert	send	rebase (Note: rebase plugin)
BitKeeper	setup	clone	pull -R	push	clone	co	pull	Unknown	add	rm	mv	cp	pull	commit	undo	makepatch	collapse
IBM DevOps Code ClearCase	init	N/A	N/A	N/A	N/A	checkout	update	lock – unlock	mkelem	rmname	mv	N/A	merge	checkin	uncheckout – rmver	N/A	findmerge
CVS	init	N/A	N/A	N/A	N/A	checkout	update	Unknown	add	rm	N/A	N/A	update -j	commit	remove [then] update	N/A	N/A
CVSNT	init	N/A	N/A	N/A	N/A	checkout	update	edit	add	rm	rename	N/A	update -j	commit	update -C	N/A	N/A
darcs	init	clone	pull	push	N/A (Note: darcs doesn't have named branches, local or not, branching is handled solely through repository cloning)	clone	pull	Unknown	add	remove	move	N/A	pull – push	record	revert	send -o (Note: darcs send prepares a bundle of patches, defaults to sending it by mail but can send it to a file instead)	rebase
Fossil	new – open	clone	pull	push	branch – commit –branch	clone/open	update	N/A	add	rm/del	mv/rename	N/A	merge	commit	revert	Fossil's repository is single sqlite file itself	N/A
Git	init – init –bare	clone – clone –bare	fetch	push	branch	checkout	pull	N/A	add	rm	mv	cp [then] git add (Note: copies are detected after the fact, much like renames)	merge	commit	reset –hard	bundle	rebase
Mercurial	init	clone	pull	push	bookmark (Note: Mercurial Bookmarks are similar to local branches.)	update – up – checkout – co	pull -u	N/A	add	remove – rm	move – mv	copy – cp	merge	commit – ci	revert	bundle	rebase
Monotone	init	clone	pull	push	N/A	checkout	update	Unknown	add	drop	rename	N/A	merge	commit	revert	N/A	N/A
Perforce Helix Core	p4 client && p4 sync	p4 sync	p4 sync	p4 submit	Requires migration to recent streams feature	edit	sync	lock – unlock	add	delete	move	copy	integrate	submit	revert	Unknown	N/A
Source Code Control System	create	N/A	N/A	N/A	admin -fb	get (readonly) – edit	get (readonly) – edit	N/A (Note: SCCS has implicit locks, applied when checking out via edit, removed when creating a delta.)	create	N/A	N/A	N/A	edit -i	delta	get -r	N/A	edit -i
Subversion	svnadmin create	svnadmin hotcopy	[work-around]: svnadmin load	[work-around]: svnadmin dump	N/A	checkout – co	update – up	lock	add	delete – del – remove – rm	move – mv – rename – ren	copy – cp	merge	commit – ci	revert	N/A	N/A
Surround SCM	mkmainline	N/A	N/A	N/A	mkbranch	checkout	get	checkout	add	rm	move	N/A	merge	checkin	voidcheckout	N/A	rebase
Vesta	vcreate	vrepl	vrepl	vrepl	N/A	vcheckout	vadvance	vcheckout	[... then] vcheckin (Note: Through any of various means, place (to-be-immutable) file in an immutable directory prior to vcheckin.)	vrm	mv [then] vcheckin (Note: mv(1) or link(2) the immutable file from its origin immutable directory to its destination immutable directory prior to vcheckin.)	cp [then] vcheckin (Note: Through any of various means, copy the immutable file from its origin immutable directory to its destination immutable directory prior to vcheckin.)	vdiff	vcheckin	vcheckin -c 0	vmake [or] vesta	vadvance
Visual SourceSafe	?	Unknown	Unknown	Unknown	N/A	Get Latest	Get Latest	Check Out	Add Files	Delete	?	Unknown	?	Check In	Undo Check Out	Unknown	Unknown
Software	Repository init	clone	pull	push	Local branches	checkout	update	lock	add	remove	move	copy	merge	commit	revert	generate bundle file	rebase

== Advanced commands ==
The following table shows the commands used to execute common tasks in notable version-control systems.

Table explanation

- Command aliases: create custom aliases for specific commands or combination thereof
- Lock/unlock: exclusively lock a file to prevent others from editing it
- Shelve/unshelve: temporarily set aside part or all of the changes in the working directory
- Rollback: remove a patch/revision from history
- Cherry-picking: move only some revisions from a branch to another one (instead of merging the branches)
- Bisect: binary search of source history for a change that introduced or fixed a regression
- Incoming/outgoing: query the differences between the local repository and a remote one (the patches that would be fetched/sent on a pull/push)
- Grep: search repository for lines matching a pattern
- Record: include only some changes to a file in a commit and not others
- Note: Commands in green rectangles that are not surrounded by [square brackets] are at an interactive command-line prompt. Text in [square brackets] is an explanation of where to find equivalent functionality.

Software	Command aliases	Lock/unlock	Shelve/unshelve	Rollback	Cherry-picking	Bisect	Incoming/outgoing	Grep	Record
AccuRev SCM	N/A	enable file locking	N/A	revert -purge	promote	N/A	N/A	N/A	Unknown
Azure DevOps	Yes	lock/unlock	shelve/unshelve	rollback	merge	N/A	Unknown	Unknown	N/A
GNU Bazaar	[in '.bazaar/bazaar.conf' file]	N/A	shelve/unshelve	uncommit	merge (non-tracking)	bisect (bisect plugin)	missing -theirs-only / -mine-only	grep (grep plugin)	N/A
BitKeeper	Unknown	Unknown	park/unpark	undo	Unknown	bisect	changes -R/-L	grep	Unknown
CVSNT	[in '.cvsrc' file]	edit -x/unedit (Note: One can also enable this as a central preference in the repository server control panel or configuration file.)	N/A	admin -o (Note: Requires administrator privileges. One can 'roll back' a change using 'cvs update -e -j @commitid -j "@<commitid"' but the change and rollback evidence remain in the history.)	yes (Note: yes - use TortoiseCVS or WinCVS to commit the change to the destination and select which specific files to keep)	annotate (Note: bisect is also available for cvs which should work with CVSNT)	N/A	N/A	N/A
Darcs	N/A	N/A	revert/unrevert	unrecord	yes (Note: darcs operate on patches not revision, cherrypicking simply consists in pulling a given patch from one repository to another one as long as the dependencies are fulfilled)	test -bisect	pull/push -dry-run	N/A	record
Fossil	N/A	N/A	stash pop/stash apply (Note: fossil stash supports multiple shelves with comments.)	merge -rollback	merge -cherrypick	bisect	N/A	search	N/A
Git	[in '.gitconfig' file]	N/A	stash/stash pop (Note: git stash is a multi-level shelve, it's possible to shelve several change groups at the same time)	reset HEAD^	cherry-pick	bisect	cherry	grep	add -p
Mercurial	[in '.hgrc' file]	N/A	shelve/unshelve (bundled extension)	strip (bundled extension)	graft (core) or transplant (bundled extension)	bisect	incoming/outgoing	grep	commit -interactive
Monotone	[in monotonerc]	N/A	N/A	kill_rev_locally (Note: Only works on a local repository and only on revisions without children. The disapprove command might be an alternative.)	pluck	bisect	N/A	N/A	Unknown
Perforce Helix Core	via broker	lock/unlock	shelve/unshelve	obliterate	integ	Unknown	interchanges	grep	Unknown
Subversion	N/A	lock/unlock	shelve/unshelve (Note: experimental in SVN 1.10 (release notes))	N/A	svnmerge cherry-picking	Third party tool (Note: SVN Bisect tool svn-bisect)	status -u (Note: svn status lists differences between working copy and repository, not differences between two repositories)	N/A	N/A
Surround SCM	N/A	checkout	shelf	rollback	duplicatechanges	N/A	diff	search	N/A
Software	Command aliases	Lock/unlock	Shelve/unshelve	Rollback	Cherry-picking	Bisect	Incoming/outgoing	Grep	Record

== User interfaces ==
The following table gives Web, GUI and IDE Interface specifications for notable version-control systems.

Table explanation

- Software: The name of the application that is described.
- Web Interface: Describes whether the software application contains a web interface. A web interface could allow the software to post diagnostics data to a website, or could even allow remote control of the software application.
- GUIs: A GUI is a graphical user interface. If a software product features a GUI its functionality can be accessed through application windows as opposed to accessing functionality based upon typing commands at the command prompt such as a DOS interface.
- Plug-ins: functions are available through an integrated development environment. Minimum function should be to list the revision state of a file and check in/check out files.

Software	Web interfaces	Stand-alone GUIs	Integration and/or Plug-ins for IDEs
AccuRev SCM	Yes	Windows (incl. Explorer integration), Linux, Unix, macOS, BeOS available	IntelliJ IDEA, Eclipse, Visual Studio
Azure DevOps	included (SharePoint Server used for web services)	Windows included; macOS, Unix available	Visual Studio. Java client for Eclipse IDE and IntelliJ IDEA (standard in Ultimate Edition)
GNU Bazaar	can use a plain webserver	Olive, bzr-gtk (GTK+), Bazaar Explorer (Qt), QBzr (Qt), TortoiseBzr (Windows)	Eclipse (BzrEclipse, QBzrEclipse), Visual Studio (bzr-visualstudio), TextMate (TextMateBundle), Komodo IDE, Wing IDE
BitKeeper	included	included (bkd)	Unknown
CA Software Change Manager	included	Eclipse-based GUI	Eclipse, MS Visual Studio
IBM DevOps Code ClearCase	included, Clearcase Web Interface	older: MS Windows native, Motif-based GUI for Unix-like systems, TSO client for z/OS.	Emacs, Eclipse ( IBM Proprietary, Eclipse-CCase ), Visual Studio (IBM proprietary), KDevelop (standard?), IntelliJ IDEA (standard in Ultimate Edition)
Code Co-op	Not necessary since entire project is replicated locally	Windows	Unknown
CVS	cvsweb, ViewVC, others	TortoiseCVS (Windows Explorer), TkCVS (Tcl/Tk), WinCVS, macOS, GTK, Qt available	Eclipse (Team), KDevelop (standard), IntelliJ IDEA (standard in Community and Ultimate Editions), Emacs (standard VC), Komodo IDE, BBEdit, Wing IDE
CVSNT	cvsweb, ViewVC, others	Windows, macOS, OS/400, GTK, Qt available	All those that support CVS, plus commercial plugins for SCCI, Bugzilla, Build
darcs	darcs.cgi included; darcsweb, Trac	under development; TortoiseDarcs (Windows Explorer), macOS (alpha),	Eclipse (eclipsedarcs), Emacs (vc-darcs.el)
Dimensions CM	Yes	Windows (incl. explorer integration)	Eclipse, Visual Studio, IntelliJ IDEA, XCode, Powerbuilder
Fossil	Embedded webserver included (ui/server mode), ability to run multiple repositories via CGI mode	fuel-scm	Unknown
Git	Gitweb, wit, cgit, GitLab, GitHub, gitorious, Trac, Kallithea, Bitbucket, Stash, Springloops, Bonobo Git Server, Gitea, Gogs, Forgejo	Gitoryx (macOS/Windows), gitk(wish), git-gui (Tcl/Tk), tig, Gitbox (macOS), TortoiseGit, qgit, gitg (GNOME/GTK), (h)gct (Qt), git-cola (Qt), Git Extensions (Windows), GitEye, SmartGit/Hg, Tower, SourceTree (macOS/Windows), Sprout (macOS), GitX (macOS), GitUp (macOS), GitKraken, Sublime Merge	Aptana 3 Beta (Aptana Studio 3 with Git Integration); Atom; Eclipse (JGit/EGit); Helix TeamHub; Netbeans (NbGit); KDevelop; Visual Studio (Git Extensions); Emacs (extension for standard VC, Magit); SAP Web IDE; TextMate (Git TextMate Bundle); Vim (VCSCommand plugin and fugitive plugin); IntelliJ IDEA >8.1 (standard in Community and Ultimate Editions); Komodo IDE; Anjuta; XCode, Wing IDE; PyCharm
GNU arch	ArchZoom	ArchWay (GTK2), TlaLog	Emacs (standard VC)
IC Manage	included	Windows, Linux, Unix, macOS	Emacs, Cadence Design Framework, Synopsys Custom Designer
MKS Integrity	Yes	Windows, Linux, Unix, Solaris, AIX,	Eclipse, Microsoft Visual Studio, Perforce and others. Also provides support for the industry standard Source Code Control (SCC) interface
Mercurial	included, (Note: hgweb for single-repository access and hgwebdir for multiple repository access from a single HTTP address) Trac, Kallithea	Hgk (Tcl/Tk), (h)gct (Qt), TortoiseHg (Windows Explorer, Nautilus), MacHg, MacMercurial, Murky, SourceTree (Windows/macOS), TortoiseHg, SmartGit/Hg	IntelliJ IDEA (hg4idea 3rd party plugin), Eclipse (Mercurial Eclipse), NetBeans, Visual Studio 2008, Emacs, Vim (VCSCommand plugin), Komodo IDE, Eric Python IDE, Wing IDE
Monotone	ViewMTN, TracMonotone,	Monotone-Viz (GTK+), Guitone (Qt), Monotone Browser (GTK+, Perl)	Unknown
Perforce Helix Core	included, P4Web, P4FTP	Windows, Linux, Mac macOS	Eclipse, Visual Studio, Matlab; Game Engines: Unity, Unreal, Amazon Lumberyard; Graphics: Autodesk Maya, 3ds max, Adobe PS
Rational Team Concert	Yes	Eclipse-based GUI	Eclipse integration; MS Visual Studio integration(Limited)
StarTeam	included	Windows, Java, Eclipse, Visual Studio, BDS2006 integration, plus Java command-line	IntelliJ IDEA (standard in Ultimate Edition), Visual Studio, JBuilder, Eclipse
Subversion	Apache 2 module included, WebSVN, ViewSVN, ViewVC, Trac, SharpForge, sventon, Springloops	Java, KDESVN, macOS (including Finder integration), Nautilus, Qt, RabbitVCS, RapidSVN, SourceTree (macOS), TortoiseSVN (Windows Explorer)	Anjuta, BBEdit, Eclipse (Subclipse, Subversive), Emacs (standard VC), IntelliJ IDEA (standard in Community and Ultimate Editions), KDevelop (standard), Komodo IDE, MonoDevelop (standard), Netbeans, RabbitVCS (for GEdit), TextMate (SVNMate plugin), Visual Studio (AnkhSVN, VisualSVN), Wing IDE.
Surround SCM	Yes	Windows, macOS, Linux	Eclipse, IntelliJ IDEA, JDeveloper, NetBeans, Visual Studio, WebStorm
Synergy	via Telelogic Change interface	Windows (incl. explorer integration), Linux, Unix	Eclipse (Telelogic proprietary), Visual Studio (Telelogic proprietary), IntelliJ IDEA (Telelogic proprietary)
Vault	included	Windows, Unix-like, macOS	Visual Studio 2003 and higher, Eclipse 3.2 and higher
Vesta	VestaWeb	No	No
Visual SourceSafe	none included; SSWI, VSS Remoting	Windows included; Linux, macOS and Solaris using SourceOffSite; any Java VM using Sourceanywhere for VSS	Visual Studio, IntelliJ IDEA (standard in Ultimate Edition)
Software	Web interfaces	Stand-alone GUIs	Integration and/or plug-ins for IDEs

== History and adoption ==
The following table provides historic background notes on various version-control systems:

Table explanation

- Software: The name of the application that is described.
- History: briefly describes the software's origins and development.
- Notable current users: is a list of well known projects using the software as their primary revision control system, excluding the software itself, followed by a link to a full list if available.

Software	History	Notable current users
AccuRev SCM	First publicly released in 2002	
Azure DevOps Server	First publicly released in March 2006 as Visual Studio Team System, renamed to Team Foundation Server in 2010 and Azure DevOps Server in 2019.	Microsoft
Azure DevOps Services	First publicly released in 2012 as Team Foundation Service, renamed to Visual Studio Online in 2013, Visual Studio Team Services in 2015 and Azure DevOps in 2018.	Microsoft
GNU Bazaar	Initial release 26 March 2005. Loosely related to baz. Sponsored by Canonical Ltd.	
BitKeeper	Initial release 4 May 2000. Influenced by Sun WorkShop TeamWare	
CA Software Change Manager	Original company founded in 1977; CA SCM (then called CCC/Harvest) first released in 1995.	
IBM DevOps Code ClearCase	Developed beginning in 1990 by Atria Software, following concepts developed by Apollo Computer in DSEE during the 1980s. The most recent version is 9.0.0, released in March 2016.	
Code Co-op	The first distributed VCS, demoed in 1997, released soon after.	
CVS	First publicly released 3 July 1986; based on RCS	NetBSD, OpenBSD
CVSNT	First publicly released 1998; based on CVS. Started by CVS developers with the goal adding support for a wider range of development methods and processes.	
darcs	First announced on 9 April 2003	
Dimensions CM	Developed by SQL Software under the name "PCMS Dimensions" during the late 1980s (PCMS standing for Product Configuration Management). Through number of company acquisitions the product was released under names "PVCS Dimensions" (1990s, Intersolv), "Dimensions" (early 2000s, Merant), "ChangeMan Dimensions" (2004, Serena Software) and finally "Dimensions CM" (since 2007, Serena Software).	
Fossil	Fossil and SQLite have used Fossil since 21 July 2007.	
Git	Started by Linus Torvalds in April 2005, following the BitKeeper controversy.	Linux kernel, Android, OpenJDK, Bugzilla, DragonFly BSD, FreeBSD, gcc, GNOME, GNU Emacs, GnuPG, GRUB2, KDE, MySQL, Perl 5, PostgreSQL, Python, X.Org, Cairo, Qt Development Frameworks, Samba, OpenEmbedded, Ruby, Ruby on Rails, Wine, Fluxbox, Openbox, Compiz Fusion, XCB, Xen, ELinks, XMMS2, e2fsprogs, GNU Core Utilities, DokuWiki, Drupal, LibreOffice, MediaWiki, Mono, ASP.NET MVC, ADO.NET Entity Framework, NuGet, jQuery and many of its plugins, OpenCV, Twitter, Netflix, LinkedIn, Wireshark, Django, many companies like Eclipse Foundation, Ericsson, Microsoft, Huawei, Apple, Amazon, LG
GNU arch	Started by Tom Lord in 2001, it later became part of the GNU project. Lord resigned as maintainer in August 2005.	
IC Manage	Developed by IC Manage, Inc which was founded in 2003 by Shiv Sikand and Dean Drako.	
PTC Integrity	Originally developed by MKS Software. Purchased by PTC in May 2011	
Mercurial	Started 6 April 2005 by Matt Mackall, following the BitKeeper controversy. First released on 19 April 2005	GNU Multi-Precision Library, GNU Octave, Pidgin, XEmacs
Monotone	First released in April 2003	
Perforce Helix Core	Developed by Perforce Software, Inc which was founded in 1995 by Christopher Seiwald.	
Rational Team Concert	Version 1.0 released in June 2008	
Revision Control System	July 1985	
Source Code Control System	Started by Marc Rochkind in 1972 (binary history files, written in Snobol on IBM-370, SCCSv4 with text history files was published 18 February 1977. The same history file format is still used in SCCS 5.0.	
StarTeam	Version 1.0 1995; Developed by StarBase software, acquired by Borland(which was acquired by Micro Focus).	
Apache Subversion	Started in 2000 by CVS developers with goal of replacing CVS	
Synergy	Developed beginning in 1988 by Caseware, as AmplifyControl. The company was renamed Continuus in 1994, where the product became better known as Continuus/CM. Continuus was acquired by Telelogic in 1999 shortly after going public; the product was renamed Telelogic Synergy. IBM acquired Telelogic in 2008 for integration into their Rational tool suite. The product is now known as IBM Rational Synergy.	
Vault	First publicly released in February 2003	Unknown
Vesta	First publicly released under the LGPL in 2001	
Visual SourceSafe	originally created by a company called One Tree Software, version 3.1. Company was bought by Microsoft which released version 4.0 of VSS around 1995	
Software	History	Notable current users

== See also ==
- Comparison of source-code-hosting facilities
- List of version-control software
