= List of version-control software =

This is a list of notable version control software systems.

== Common attributes ==
- Openness, whether the software is open source or proprietary
- Repository model, how working and shared source code is handled
  - Shared, all developers use the same file system
  - Client–server, users access a master repository server via a client; typically, a client machine holds only a working copy of a project tree; changes in one working copy are committed to the master repository before becoming available to other users
  - Distributed, repositories act as peers; typically each user has a local repository clone with complete version history in addition to their working files

== Active ==
- AccuRev [proprietary, client-server] – source configuration management tool with integrated issue tracking based on "Streams" that manages parallel and global development; replication server is also available; now owned by Micro Focus
- Autodesk Vault [proprietary, client-server] – Version control tool specifically designed for Autodesk applications managing the complex relationships between design files such as AutoCAD and Autodesk Inventor
- CADES [proprietary, client-server] – Designer productivity and version control system by International Computers Limited
- ClearCase [proprietary, client-server] – MSSCCI compliant (Source Control Plug-in API) configuration management system by IBM Rational Software
- Darcs [open, distributed] – originally developed by David Roundy; track inter-patch dependencies and automatically rearranges and cherry-pick them using a theory of patches
- Dimensions CM [proprietary, client-server] – software change and configuration management system developed by Micro Focus, formerly Serena Software, that includes revision control
- Diversion [proprietary, client-server] – A cloud-based version control system for game development and projects with large 3D assets
- Fossil [open, distributed] – written by D. Richard Hipp for SQLite; distributed revision control, wiki, bug-tracking, and forum (all-in-one solution) with console and web interfaces; single portable executable and single repository file
- Git [open, distributed] – designed by Linus Torvalds for Linux kernel development; decentralized; goals: fast, flexible, and robust
- Global Design Platform (GDP) [proprietary, client-server] – design data management for IC design and Perforce infrastructure support
- Integrity [proprietary, client-server]
- Perforce P4 (formerly known by Perforce Helix and Perforce Helix Core) [proprietary, client-server] – for large scale development environments
- Mercurial [open, distributed] – written in Python as an open source replacement to BitKeeper; decentralized and aims to be fast, lightweight, portable, and easy to use
- OpenCVS – unreleased CVS clone under a BSD license, emphasizing security and source code correctness
- Panvalet [proprietary, shared] – Around since the 1970s, source and object control for IBM mainframe computers
- PVCS [proprietary, client-server] – developed by Don Kinzer at Polytron, first released in 1985; now owned by Micro Focus
- Razor [proprietary, ?] – integrated suite from Visible Systems
- Revision Control System (RCS) [open, shared] – stores the latest version and backward deltas for the fastest access to the trunk tip compared to SCCS and an improved user interface, at the cost of slow branch tip access and missing support for included/excluded deltas
- Source Code Control System (SCCS) [open, shared] – part of UNIX; based on interleaved deltas, can construct versions as arbitrary sets of revisions; extracting an arbitrary version takes essentially the same time and is thus more useful in environments that rely heavily on branching and merging with multiple "current" and identical versions
- StarTeam [proprietary, client-server] – coordinates and manages software delivery process by Micro Focus, formerly Borland; centralized control of digital assets and activities
- Subversion (SVN) [open, client-server] – versioning control system inspired by CVS
- Surround SCM [proprietary, client-server] – version control tool by Seapine Software
- Synergy [proprietary, client-server] – MSSCCI compliant (Source Control Plug-in API) integrated change management and task-based configuration management system, proprietary of IBM
- Team Concert [proprietary, client-server] – Collaboration and application lifecycle management platform by IBM Rational Software
- Team Foundation Version Control [proprietary, client-server] – version control system developed by Microsoft for Team Foundation Server, now Azure DevOps Server
- The Librarian [proprietary, shared] – Around since 1969, source control for IBM mainframe computers; from Applied Data Research, later acquired by Computer Associates
- Unity Version Control (previously known as Plastic SCM) [proprietary, client-server] – by Codice Software, Inc and Unity Technologies
- Vault [proprietary, client-server] – version control tool by SourceGear; first installation can be used for free

== Obsolete ==
The following have been discontinued or not released in more than a decade.

- Bazaar [open, distributed] – written in Python, originally by Martin Pool and sponsored by Canonical; decentralised: goals: fast and easy to use; can losslessly import Arch archives; replaced by friendly fork named Breezy
- BitKeeper [open, distributed] – (discontinued) was used in Linux kernel development (2002 – April 2005) until its license was revoked for breach of contract; open-sourced in 2016
- Code Co-op [open, proprietary] – (discontinued) peer-to-peer version control system (can use e-mail for synchronization)
- Concurrent Versions System (CVS) [open, client-server] – originally built on RCS, licensed under the GPL
  - CVSNT – cross-platform port of CVS that allows case insensitive file names among other changes
  - OpenCVS – unreleased CVS clone under a BSD license, emphasizing security and source code correctness
- Configuration Management Version Control (CMVC) [proprietary, client-server] – version control system, no longer available
- GNU arch [open, distributed] – A very early system; deprecated since 2009 in favor of Bazaar
- DCVS [open, distributed] – A decentralized spin on CVS, last released 2006 and since discontinued
- Microsoft Delta [proprietary, client-server] – (discontinued) commercial version control system released by Microsoft in 1993 for MS-DOS and Windows; discontinued in 1994 following Microsoft's acquisition of SourceSafe from One Tree Software
- Monotone [open, distributed] – not updated since 2011
- Quma Version Control System – [open] VCS, final release 2010, abandoned 2013
- Sun WorkShop TeamWare – Designed by Larry McVoy, creator of BitKeeper
- Vesta [open, client-server] – (discontinued) build system with a versioning file system and support for distributed repositories
- Visual SourceSafe (VSS) [proprietary, client-server] – version control tool by Microsoft; oriented toward small teams. Final release in 2005.

== See also ==
- Comparison of version-control software
- Comparison of source-code-hosting facilities
