= Azure DevOps =

Azure DevOps may refer to:

- Azure DevOps Server, collaboration software for software development formerly known as Team Foundation Server and Visual Studio Team System
- Azure DevOps Services, cloud service for software development formerly known as Visual Studio Team Services, Visual Studio Online and Team Foundation Service Preview

== See also ==
- Microsoft Azure
- Microsoft Visual Studio
- DevOps, a general term of a set of practices that combines software development (Dev) and IT operations (Ops)
