= LXR =

LXR may refer to:

- LXR Cross Referencer, a software tool
- Luxury Resorts, owned by the Blackstone Group.
- Air Luxor (ICAO code), a former airline
- Liver X receptor, a member of the nuclear receptor family of transcription factors
- Luxor International Airport (IATA airport code)
- LX(R)-class amphibious warfare ship
- LXR Hotels & Resorts, a division of Hilton Worldwide
