= TH1 =

TH1 may refer to:

- Th1 cell, a type of T helper cells
- Tianhe-I (TH-1), a Chinese super computer
- TH1 the scripting language for web pages in fossil (software), the Fossil SCM
- Windows 10 Threshold 1
- TH-1, a character in The Source (Ayreon album)
- TH-1 (Phytophthora infestans), a subpopulation of the Ia mtDNA haplotype of the A2 mating type
- th1 [evnslower], a track by Aphex Twin
