= QVCS =

Family of version control systems

- Original author: Jim Voris
- Developer: Quma Software
- Initial release: 1991; 35 years ago
- Final release: 3.10.20 / April 5, 2010; 15 years ago
- Written in: C++
- Operating system: Windows
- Type: Revision control
- License: Freeware
- Repository: unknown

QVCS Enterprise
- Original author: Jim Voris
- Developer: Quma Software
- Initial release: 1998; 28 years ago
- Stable release: 3.0.9 / April 14, 2014; 11 years ago
- Written in: Java
- Operating system: Windows, OS X, Solaris
- Type: Revision control
- License: Apache 2.0 License
- Website: github.com/jimv39/qvcsos
- Repository: unknown

QVCS (Quma Version Control System) is a family of version control system products historically published by Quma Software, Inc.

== History ==
QVCS was first published in 1991 as a set of command line utilities for the Amiga.

Quma ported that original Amiga product to the Microsoft Windows platform in 1996. In 2000, QVCS-Pro was introduced with additional features, including support for MSSCCI compliant Source Control Plug-in API integrated development environments. In 2004, the cross-platform QVCS-Enterprise product was introduced. QVCS and QVCS-Pro are written in C++. QVCS-Enterprise is written in Java.

On January 1, 2012, QVCS-Pro and QVCS were made freeware. QVCS-Enterprise followed suit on June 16, 2012, and then was open sourced under the Apache 2.0 License on March 2, 2014.

At some time after June 23, 2013, the domain name qumasoft.com was abandoned. It is now (June 2015) owned by a weight loss company. The contents of the Web site when it was operated by the author of QVCS is available on the Wayback Machine.

== Market ==
QVCS and QVCS-Pro target smaller Windows only development teams. QVCS-Enterprise is a client–server application, is cross-platform, and is designed for use by distributed development teams.

== See also ==
- Revision control
- List of revision control software
