= Branching (version control) =

Duplication of an object under version control

Branching, in version control and software configuration management, is the duplication of an object under version control (such as a source code file or a directory tree). Each object can thereafter be modified separately and in parallel so that the objects become different. In this context the objects are called branches. The users of the version control system can branch any branch.

Branches are also known as trees, streams or codelines. The originating branch is sometimes called the parent branch, the upstream branch (or simply upstream, especially if the branches are maintained by different organizations or individuals), or the backing stream.

== Trunk ==
Child branches are branches that have a parent; a branch without a parent is referred to as the trunk or the mainline. The trunk is also sometimes loosely referred to as HEAD, but properly head refers not to a branch, but to the most recent commit on a given branch, and both the trunk and each named branch has its own head. The trunk is usually meant to be the base of a project on which development progresses. If developers are working exclusively on the trunk (so called trunk-based development), it always contains the latest cutting-edge version of the project, but therefore may also be the most unstable version. A release toggle lets unfinished work land on the trunk while that branch stays deployable. A product guide to trunk-based development documents this use of a release toggle. Another approach is to split a branch off the trunk, implement changes in that branch and merge the changes back into the trunk when the branch has proven to be stable and working. Depending on development mode and commit policy the trunk may contain the most stable or the least stable or something-in-between version. Other terms for trunk include baseline, mainline, and master, though in some cases these are used with similar but distinct senses – see version control § Common terminology. Often main developer work takes place in the trunk and stable versions are branched, and occasional bug-fixes are merged from branches to the trunk. When development of future versions is done in non-trunk branches, it is usually done for projects that do not change often, or where a change is expected to take a long time to develop until it will be ready for incorporating in the trunk.

== Merging ==
Branching generally implies the ability to later merge or integrate changes back onto the parent branch. Often the changes are merged back to the trunk, even if this is not the parent branch. A branch not intended to be merged (e.g. because it has been relicensed under an incompatible license by a third party, or it attempts to serve a different purpose) is usually called a fork.

== Motivations for branching ==
Branches allow for parts of software to be developed in parallel. Large projects require many roles to be filled, including developers, build managers, and quality assurance personnel. Further, multiple releases on different operating system platforms may have to be maintained. Branches allow contributors to isolate changes without destabilizing the codebase, for example, fixes for bugs, new features, and versions integration. These changes may be later merged (resynchronized) after testing.

Branches can also be used to implement vendor branching, a relatively simple strategy to use, track and optionally modify source code (basically anything text based, but there exist ways to handle binary objects too) that is published by external "upstream" parties ("vendors"). With this approach, fairly common since the CVS times, a separate branch is created to keep the vendor-provided code. This branch is updated with new upstream releases (this is called a vendor drop) and merged into the main codebase, where vendor code will then sometimes need to be modified to suit the local project. The vendor branch can also be used to provide fixes to the vendor (fixes that are to be merged back locally; this may give rise to expected merge conflict resolution in the next vendor drop if the vendor integrates the fix in their code) .

== Development branch ==
A development branch or development tree of a piece of software is a version that is under development, and has not yet been officially released. In the open source community, the notion of release is typically metaphorical, since anyone can usually check out any desired version, whether it be in the development branch or not. Often, the version that will eventually become the next major version is called the development branch. However, there is often more than one subsequent version of the software under development at a given time.

Often, the development branch is the trunk. Some revision control systems have specific jargon for the main development branch. For example, in CVS, it is called the "MAIN" branch. Git uses "master" by default, although GitHub set "main" as the default branch name for new repositories, replacing "master" because of its association with slavery.

== Shadow or magic branches ==
In cvc and CVSNT, a shadow or magic branch "shadows" changes made in the upstream branch, to make it easier to maintain small changes. cvc is an open-source package building system incorporating a revision-control system for packages produced by rPath.

== Distributed revision control ==
=== Repository clones ===
In distributed revision control, the entire repository, with branches, may be copied and worked on further. Monotone (mtn), Mercurial (hg) and git call it "clone"; Bazaar calls it "branch".

In some distributed revision control systems, such as Darcs, there is no distinction made between repositories and branches; in these systems, fetching a copy of a repository is equivalent to branching.

== See also ==
- Revision tag
