= CVSNT =

Software version control system

- Developer: March Hare Software, Ltd.
- Initial release: 1998
- Stable release: 2009R2 / September 15, 2017; 8 years ago
- Operating system: Unix-like, Linux, Windows, Mac OS X, OS/400
- Type: Version control
- License: GNU GPL, GNU LGPL, others
- Website: march-hare.com/cvsnt/
- Repository: [cvs://:pserver:cvs:@cvs.cvsnt.org:/cvsnt cvs://:pserver:cvs:@cvs.cvsnt.org:/cvsnt]

CVSNT is a version control system compatible with and originally based on Concurrent Versions System (CVS), but whereas that was popular in the open-source world, CVSNT included features designed for developers working on commercial software including support for Windows, Active Directory authentication, reserved branches/locking, per-file access control lists and Unicode filenames. Also included in CVSNT were various RCS tools updated to work with more recent compilers and compatible with CVSNT.

CVSNT was initially developed by users unhappy with the limitations of CVS 1.10.8, addressing limitations related to running CVS server on Windows and handling filenames for case-insensitive platforms. March Hare Software began sponsorship of the project in July 2004 to guarantee the project's future and to employ the original project manager on CVSNT development and commercial support.

CVSNT was commercially popular, with a number of commercial IDEs directly including support for it including Oracle JDeveloper, IBM Rational Application Developer, and IBM WebSphere Business Modeler. The CVSNT variation of RCS tools were also widely used, including by Apple, Inc. CVSNT was so ubiquitous in commercial programming that it was often referred to simply as CVS, even though the open-source CVS developers had publicly stated that CVSNT was significantly different and should be kept as a separate project.

Several books were written about CVSNT including CVSNT (CVS for NT) and All About CVS.

== Features ==
CVSNT keeps track of the version history of a project (or set of files).

CVSNT is based on the same client–server architecture as the Concurrent Versions System: a server stores the current version(s) of the project and its history, and clients connect to the server in order to check-out a complete copy of the project, work on this copy and then later check-in their changes. A server may be a caching or proxy server (a read only server that passes on write requests to another server) or a read and write (normal) server.

Typically, client and server connect over a WAN or Internet, but client and server may both run on the same LAN or even the same machine. The server software runs equally well on Unix and Windows. It is compatible with CVS clients and supports a large number of configuration management methodologies including the CVS compatible unreserved method and the VSS-like reserved method.

The modular nature of CVSNT allows server administrators to dynamically enable and disable protocols as well as load additional functions via triggers such as Audit, Defect Tracking Integration, Automatic Checkout (for webservers) and more.

CVSNT Server features include:

- Access control for securing projects and branches.
- Detailed audit and metrics recorded in an SQL database.
- Authentication with Active Directory.
- Tracking everything about the change - including whether it was merged from somewhere, belongs to a problem report or was part of a change set.
- A control panel to manage email notification of changes, defect tracking integration, and more.
- Integrated repository synchronisation (for fail-over servers).
- Change set support (group changes by defect number).
- Supports Unicode UTF-8/UCS-2 files and multi-lingual filenames.
- When operating in UTF-8 (Unicode) mode it can automatically translate filename encoding for any client.
- Plug-ins for email notification.
- Helps make merging branches easier with its "Mergepoint" feature.
- Native servers available for Mac OS X, Windows, Linux, Solaris, HP-UX.
- Supports reserved and unreserved versioning methodologies.
- CVSAPI for integration into third-party products.
- Script, COM and 3GL interface for triggers and integration into 3rd party tools (such as defect tracking)

== History and status ==
Users unhappy with the limitations of CVS 1.10.8 began the development of CVSNT. The original limitations addressed were related to running CVS server on Windows and handling filenames for case-insensitive platforms.

The first version was released in 1998, and stable feature releases have been released roughly every three to four months since. Linux and Unix support was re-added to CVSNT in early 2002.

From the project's inception until October 2002 CVSNT and CVS used identical version numbers and CVSNT was "kept in sync" with the features and code base of CVS. After October 2002, CVSNT began its own version sequence beginning with "2" to indicate significant departure from its CVS origins. Since that time, there has not been a stable feature release of CVS. However the unstable CVS 1.12 contains some of the oldest features originally implemented in CVSNT. Due to this shared history, all features from CVS 1.11 are included in CVSNT and most from CVS 1.12 (e.g.: the 1.12 'ls' feature is functionally compatible with the CVSNT 'ls').

In 2003, the CVSNT SJIS project released a Japanese version of CVSNT including support for SJIS filenames and file encoding.

March Hare Software began sponsorship of the project in July 2004 to guarantee the project's future and to employ the original project manager on CVSNT development and commercial support.

In February 2005, the project servers moved to CVSNT version 2.5 and began unstable releases of a new server incorporating server plugins, ACLs, filename character set conversion as well as client/server autodiscovery. In October 2005, the first commercial CVS Suite was released, incorporating non-GPL addins and clients for CVSNT. In November 2005, CVSNT was enhanced to incorporate the features of the CVSNT SJIS project.

In March 2006, the project servers moved to CVSNT version 2.6 and began unstable releases of the new server backend. This backend incorporated a partial SQL database repository to facilitate better server performance and more complex server features. When work was abandoned on CVSNT 2.6 and moved to EVS/CVSNT 3.1 the project server was moved back to 2.5.04.

In November 2008, the project released version 2.5.04 with support for multi-site repository replication or 'local' repository caches and specific performance features for using large files use over a WAN. The project began advertising for contributors more aggressively including placing advertising in commit comments (which can be turned off).

In March 2010, the project released version 2.5.05 with a server that always runs in Unicode, native Windows crypt and schannel support and support for Internationalized Domain Names.

The status of the project is active, with further releases of CVSNT 2.5 planned, and continuing evolution of CVSNT/EVS 3.1. CVSNT/EVS will implement a complete SQL database repository to support further complex server and client features. An RCS emulation layer is also planned for CVSNT/EVS 3.1 to support legacy systems.

On June 30, 2010, March Hare retired the zero-dollar Community edition, however the commercial "CVS Suite" edition with a new CVSNT 2.8 release and support is actively developed and available from the web store, as are snapshots of the older community releases (unsupported, and a fee is required to download). Email support is available for customers but the community mailing list/newsgroup has been removed. The description of the public CVS server for source code was updated with the caveat "not guaranteed to be available 24x7, is provided by a volunteer and may be withdrawn at any time". This arrangement appears to fulfil the requirements of the GPL, since the software offered for download includes a written offer to receive the source code, as is explicitly required by the license.

== Embedded ==
Software incorporating CVSNT includes:

- TortoiseCVS recommend CVSNT for both Unix and Windows machines.
- WinCVS was developed in close cooperation with CVSNT project.
- VP/MS

== Future roadmap ==
March Hare plans to deliver the following features in the next release:

- Atomic Commits
- Database backend (no more Revision Control System (RCS) files)
- RCS "interface" for legacy integrating

== See also ==
- List of revision control software
- Comparison of revision control software
