= Vault (version control system) =

- Developer: SourceGear LLC
- Initial release: 2003; 23 years ago
- Stable release: SourceGear Vault Professional 10.0.2 / April 9, 2019; 6 years ago
- Operating system: Windows XP, Windows Server 2003 (Client only), Vista, Windows 7, 8, Windows Server 2008, 2008R2, 2012
- Platform: CLI
- Type: Revision control
- License: Proprietary commercial software
- Website: www.sourcegear.com/vault/

Vault is a commercial, proprietary version control system by SourceGear LLC which markets its product as a replacement for Microsoft's Visual Source Safe. Vault uses Microsoft SQL Server as a back end database and provides atomic commits to the version control system. The tool is built on top of Microsoft .NET.

Fortress, originally an application lifecycle management (ALM) product marketed separately for use with Vault, was later merged into Vault releases. Third-party products have been designed to be integrated with Vault such as OnTime, FogBugz, TeamCity, and SmartBear CodeCollaborator.

== See also ==
- Revision control
- List of revision control software
