= Dimensions CM =

- Developer: OpenText
- Release: 1992; 34 years ago or earlier.
- Stable release: 14.7 (Dec 2023)
- Operating system: Cross-platform
- Type: Software configuration management
- License: OpenText EULA
- Website: microfocus.com/products/dimensions-cm

Dimensions CM is a software change and configuration management product developed by OpenText Corporation. It includes revision control, change, build and release management capabilities.

Since 2014 (v14.1) Dimensions CM includes PulseUno module providing Code review and Continuous integration capabilities. Starting with the version 14.5.2 (2020) it can also serve as a binary repository manager.

== History ==
Previous product names:

- PCMS Dimensions (SQL Software)
- PVCS Dimensions (Merant, Intersolv)

== See also ==
- List of revision control software
- Comparison of revision control software
