= SVNBridge =

SvnBridge
- Developer: Microsoft
- Initial release: October 17, 2007; 18 years ago
- Stable release: v6.2 / September 12, 2013; 12 years ago
- Written in: C#
- Operating system: Microsoft Windows
- Type: Plug-in
- License: Microsoft Public License
- Website: www.codeplex.com/SvnBridge
- Repository: www.codeplex.com/SvnBridge

SVNBridge is an extension for Microsoft Azure DevOps Server (formerly Team Foundation Server or TFS) that allows the use of a Subversion client (e.g., TortoiseSVN) with Azure DevOps Server. SVNBridge is available free under the Microsoft Public License (Ms-PL).

== Overview ==
Svnbridge is an open source project hosted on the Microsoft Codeplex project site. Support for accessing Codeplex via subversion has been described by CodePlex as 'our number one requested feature'. SVNBridge allows developers to participate in CodePlex projects while still using Subversion based tools they are familiar with.

The SVNBridge project provides two related SVNBridge products with differing modes of operation:

- Either running as a client daemon (systray item) on Windows systems allowing Subversion applications on the client to access Azure DevOps revision control items on a remote Azure DevOps server.
- Or as an IIS web application on the Azure DevOps server itself; thus enabling Subversion clients to connect directly to the Azure DevOps server using the Subversion http protocols, and without requiring additional software on the client. In this latter mode it provided an interoperability solution for Unix/Linux/macOS based Subversion tools.
