= Microsoft Delta =

Discontinued source control software

- Microsoft Delta 1.0
- Original author: Microsoft
- Developer: Microsoft
- Release: 1993; 33 years ago
- Operating system: MS-DOS, Windows
- Type: Version control
- License: Proprietary commercial software

Microsoft Delta is a discontinued commercial source control program developed by Microsoft. It was publicly released in 1993 and was designed to help PC developers manage application source code, track file revisions, and coordinate updates among developers. Microsoft discontinued the public version of the product in 1994 after the company acquired One Tree Software and its competing source control product, SourceSafe.

== History ==
In the 1980s, Microsoft created an internal source control system called Source Library Manager to manage the development of its increasingly complex software products. The tool, abbreviated "SLM" (pronounced "slime"), was designed for DOS, OS/2, and UNIX environments. It functioned by maintaining a central master copy of a project and allowed individual developers to work on private local copies. Developers would periodically install their changes into the master source, while others could synchronize their local copies to incorporate those updates. This workflow supported a model that allowed multiple users to modify different sections of the same file at the same time, which could then be merged together.

Building on the SLM codebase, Microsoft developed and published Delta in 1993 as a commercial source control product. Unlike its predecessor, Delta was limited to the MS-DOS and 16-bit Windows environments and was incompatible with 32-bit platforms such as Windows NT. At launch, single-user licenses were priced at $495. Volume licensing was also available, with packages of 5-user licenses for $2,079 and 20-user licenses for $7,920.

In November 1994, Microsoft acquired the software developer One Tree Software, which produced a competing source control product called SourceSafe. After their acquisition, Microsoft discontinued Delta and focused on SourceSafe as their commercial source control software. Internally, Microsoft continued to use SLM for many of its development projects until 2000–2002, when it was replaced with Source Depot.
