= CA Harvest Software Change Manager =

- Developers: Softool (–1995); Platinum Technology (1995–1999); CA Technologies (1999–present)
- Stable release: r13.0.4 / June 19, 2019; 6 years ago
- Operating system: Microsoft Windows, Z-Linux, Linux, AIX, Solaris, MAC OS X
- Type: Revision control
- License: Proprietary EULA
- Website: www.broadcom.com/products/software/business-management/ca-service-management/harvest-software-change-manager

CA Harvest Software Change Manager (originally known as CCC/Harvest) is a software tool for the configuration management (revision control, SCM, etc.) of source code and other software development assets.

== History ==
The first CCC (acronym for 'Change and Configuration Control') product was released in the early 70s and was designed as a project for a Defense Department contractor in Santa Barbara CA. (The company at the time was Hughes Aircraft, now Santa Barbara Research Center for Raytheon.) It became the first commercially available CM tool.

CCC was designed to manage all the components that went into an aircraft engine, and seeing as the same engine was used by both the U.S. Air Force and U.S. Navy (for the F-14 Tomcat and F-15 Eagle) it required robust and reliable parallel development.

The first version of CCC/Harvest was commercially developed by Softool Corporation, a CM-focused software company founded in 1977 in Goleta, CA. Other CCC tools included CCC/Manager, CCC/DM Turnkey and CCC/QuickTrak.

Softool was acquired in late 1995 by Platinum Technology, which was later acquired in May 1999 by Computer Associates (now known as CA Technologies) who added CCC/Harvest to their AllFusion suite. In 2002, the 'CCC' part of the name was dropped, and 'Change Manager' was added so it became known as AllFusion Harvest Change Manager. Later this was changed to CA Harvest Software Change Manager.

== Distinguishing features ==
- Change Packages: Harvest can provide both version control and change management. The developer makes changes in Harvest against a change package (creating a "change set"). The change package(s) will initially consist of a number of files that the developer has either created or amended. This is the version control component of Harvest.
- Life Cycles: Once the developer is satisfied with his/her changes, the changes progress through a pre-defined life cycle (i.e. into a number of sequential TEST stages and finally into PRODUCTION). At all these stages of this "life cycle", the package must have approvals from the appropriate users or user groups. These approvals are recorded permanently for audit purposes. For example, a test manager may have to approve packages prior to moving to the TEST stage, and the production change management team may have to approve packages prior to moving to the PROD state.
- Projects (Environments): Central to Harvest's philosophy is the concept of a Harvest "project". Projects are fully customizable according to an application's, organization's, or team's needs. The term project refers to the entire control framework in Harvest and includes:
  - A branch or separate line of development where changes can be isolated (the version control component)
  - The definition of processes and how changes progress through the promotional life-cycle
  - Access control for processes and file
