= Fossil (software) =

Software configuration management, bug tracking system and wiki server

- Original author: D. Richard Hipp
- Initial release: 2006; 20 years ago
- Stable release: 2.26 / 30 April 2025; 11 months ago
- Written in: C, SQL
- Operating system: Cross-platform
- Type: Software configuration management, bug tracking system, wiki software
- License: 2010: BSD-2-Clause (Note: BSD-2-Clause since 2010-05-16.); 2007: GPL-2.0-only (Note: GPL-2.0-only from 2007-07-21 until 2010-05-16.)
- Website: www.fossil-scm.org
- Repository: fossil-scm.org/home

Fossil is a software configuration management, bug tracking system and wiki software server for use in software development created by D. Richard Hipp.

== Features ==
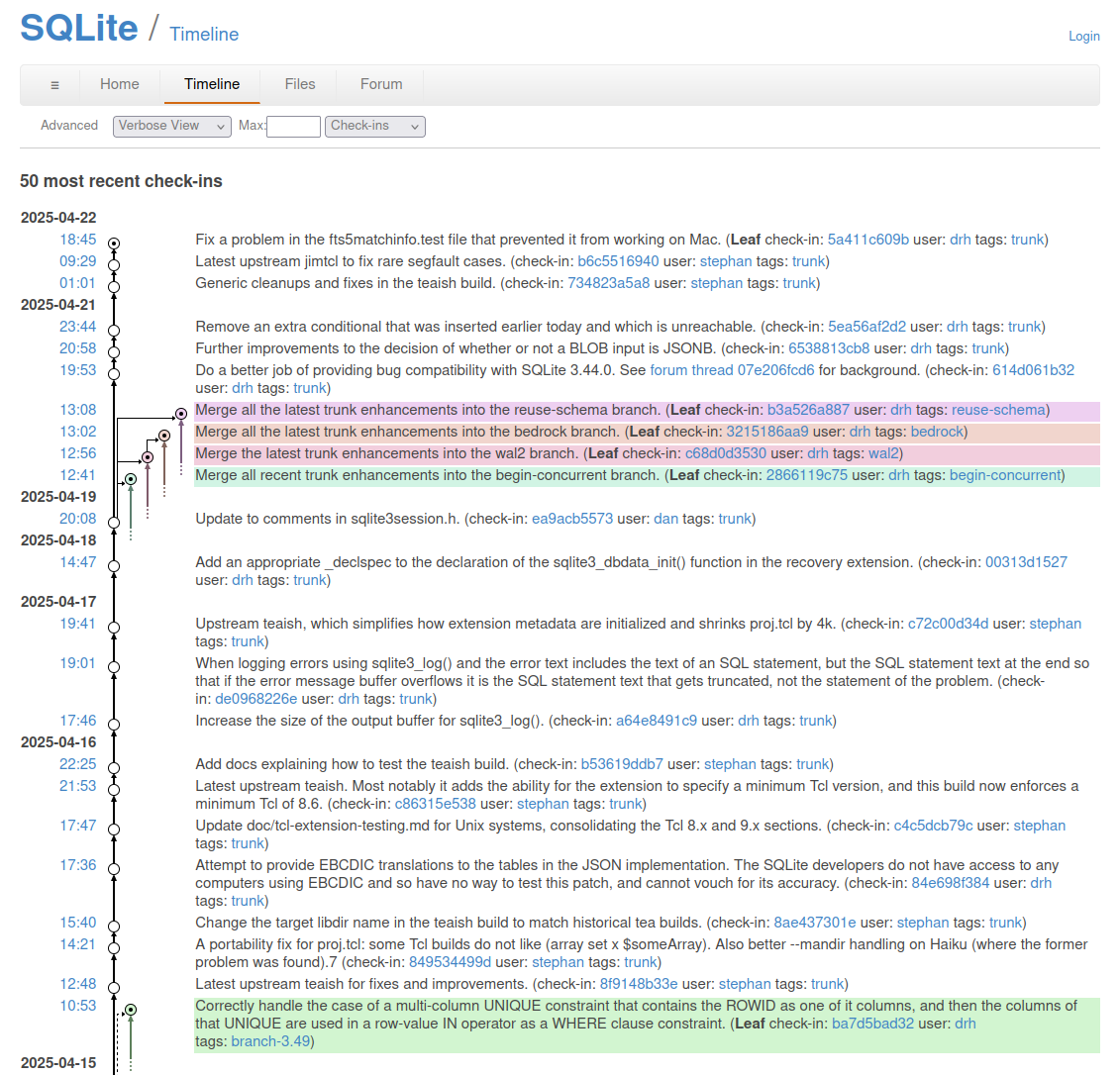
The Fossil web interface showing changes to the SQLite source tree

Fossil is a cross-platform distributed version control system that runs on Linux, BSD derivatives, Mac and Windows. It is capable of performing distributed version control, bug tracking, wiki services, and documentation.

The software has a built-in web interface, accessible from the executable via a standalone HTTP server or as a CGI application. This interface provides features akin to a software forge, including bug tracking, documentation viewing, and commit timelines.

To simplify centralized development, Fossil provides an "autosync" mode to automatically sync changes when commits are made, in a similar manner to centralized version control systems.

Content is stored in an SQLite database, allowing it to benefit from the latter's atomic transactions for corruption resistance.

Fossil is free software released under a BSD license (relicensed from previously GPL).

== Adoption ==
Fossil is used for version control by the SQLite project, which is itself a component of Fossil. SQLite transitioned to using Fossil for version control over CVS on 2009-08-12.

Fossil is additionally used for a few projects associated with Fossil and SQLite, including Tcl/Tk, Pikchr, and LuaSQLite3, as well as MySQL++, a C++ wrapper for the MySQL and MariaDB C APIs.

== See also ==
- Comparison of revision control software
- List of revision control software
