= AccuRev SCM =

AccuRev

- Developers: AccuRev, Inc.
- Release: May 18, 1999; 27 years ago
- Final release: 7.3 / March 2019; 7 years ago
- Operating system: Microsoft Windows, Linux, Mac OS X, HP-UX, Solaris, IBM AIX
- Available in: English and Japanese
- Type: Revision control
- License: Proprietary
- Website: www.microfocus.com/products/change-management/accurev/

AccuRev is a software configuration management application developed by AccuRev, Inc. and was first released in 1999. In December 2013 AccuRev was acquired by Micro Focus.

== Overview ==
AccuRev is a centralized version control system which uses a client–server model. Communication is performed via TCP/IP using a proprietary protocol. Servers function as team servers, continuous integration servers, or build servers. AccuRev is built around a stream-based architecture in which streams form a hierarchical structure of code changes where parent streams pass on certain properties to child streams. Developers make changes using command line functions, the Java GUI, the web interface, or one of the IDE plug-ins (Eclipse, Visual Studio, IntelliJ IDEA).

== Characteristics ==
Streams and parallel development
AccuRev captures and controls the relationships between code bases in parallel efforts using a stream-based architecture. This allows teams to safely store work and test it before sharing it with others, code is automatically merged or "inherited" between streams and teams once code changes are shared.

Private developer history
AccuRev has a two step check-in process. Users can check-in code privately to their workspace before sharing it with the rest of the group.

Change packages
AccuRev integrates with various ITS and project management tools. History from check-ins and promotions are tied to issues. Most SCM functions can be done on the issue level instead of by file and directory.

Distributed development
AccuRev enables remote stream structures and replication for distributed teams. Replica servers function as a local cache with all write operations happening after.

Automated merging
Streams in AccuRev automatically share and merge code with each other. This is a main distinction between streams and branches.

== See also ==
- List of version-control software
- Comparison of version-control software
