= Source Control Plug-in API =

Source Control Plug-in API (formerly known as Microsoft Source Code Control Interface, MSSCCI or simply SCC API), as applied to revision control software, means that a program uses a particular API defined by Microsoft to extend Microsoft Visual Studio. It was first developed for use with Microsoft Visual SourceSafe (VSS) and its SDK is part of the Microsoft Visual Studio SDK.
