= Springloops =

Springloops is a web-based Git and Subversion version control and hosting service with integrated deploy and code collaboration features for web and software developers. Springloops was also the name of the company behind the service until it rebranded to 84kids in May 2013.

Springloops can be used both from the command line and through a web-based graphical interface shared with BamBam!, Chime and Anchor apps from 84kids.

Springloops offers two kinds of paid plans: Personal, with 3-6GB of disk space and 10-25 repositories, and Business, with 12-60GB of space and 50 to unlimited repositories and a range of extra features. The service also provides a free plan for teachers available upon direct request via email (presumably with no limits on the account), as well as a free plan with 1 repository and 100MB of space. All plans start with a 14-day free trial.

== History ==
Springloops launched in late 2006 as an SVN version control and deploy and was gradually growing into a full-scale project management application. v2.0 was released in June 2009 with new interface and features: tasks, time tracking, wiki module and Git support. On May 5, 2013, the service was upgraded to v3.0 and received a heavy graphical overhaul. The core features were extracted into four separate apps (probably for marketing reasons): BamBam! (tasks), Chime (time tracking), Anchor (wiki) and Springloops which retained its original allocation of source & deploy tool. The apps can be used separately or integrated within one account, depending on user needs and profile.

The software’s account settings also mention Turbine, described “discussions and note-taking for teams.” It’s been greyed out and labeled “Coming soon” since the division, however.

== Controversy ==
The v3.0 upgrade spawned a wide range of reactions, especially due to drastic changes in UI and UX. In September 2013 the company released a major update which was a direct response to the feedback from users. The team wrote:

If we were to describe the changes in one word, it would be usability. We collected all feedback we’ve received from you since the redesign in May, analyzed it and introduced tons of UI improvements all around the system. It looks better, works better and certainly feels better to work with.

== Integrations ==
Pre-v3.0 iterations of Springloops allowed integration with Basecamp Classic project management software. The current version does not allow any third parties in favor of the other apps by 84kids that altogether form one integrated project management platform for web and software developers.

At the moment Springloops does not provide an open API that could be used for custom-made integrations, although the company states that works on API have commenced and are currently in progress. Users can, however, configure web hooks to send data and trigger events on designated URLs.

== See also ==
- Software deployment
- Web development software
