= Revision tag =

A revision tag is a textual label that can be associated with a specific revision of a project maintained by a version control system. This allows the user to define a meaningful name to be given to a particular state of a project that is under version control. This label can then be used in place of the revision identifier for commands supported by the version control system.

For example, in software development, a tag may be used to identify a specific release of the software such as "version 1.2".

== See also ==
- Trunk
- Branching (version control)
- Tag (metadata)
