= Cross-reference =

Reference in a book to information at another place in the same work

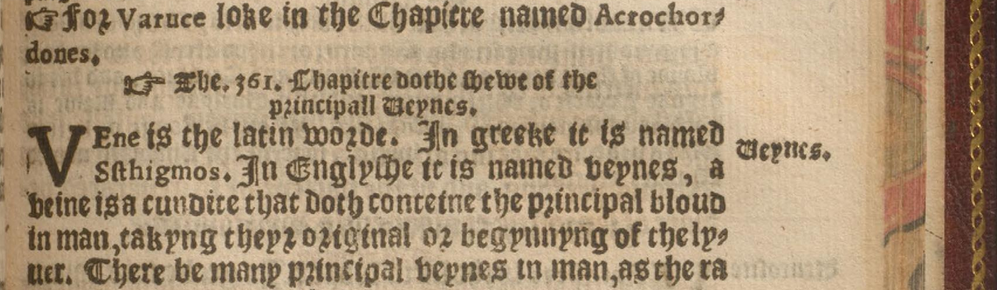
A cross-reference for varuce (varice) in Andrew Boorde's The Breviarie of Health (1502)

A cross-reference (sometimes abbreviated as xref) is an instance within a document which refers the reader to related or synonymous information elsewhere, usually within the same work. To cross-reference is to make such connections. Cross-references typically link to a related topic. Cross-referencing is usually employed by readers to either verify claims made by an author or to find information on a topic of interest. In both printed and online dictionaries cross-references are important because they form a network structure of relations existing between different parts of data, dictionary-internal as well as dictionary external.

Print reference works, such as dictionaries and encyclopedias, have used various typographical elements such as bold text, small caps, or italics; symbols such as the manicule or arrow; and the words see also or for to indicate terms that can be cross-referenced. For example, under the term Albert Einstein in the index of a book about Nobel Laureates, there may be the cross-reference See Also: Einstein, Albert. Cross-references and marginal notes in printed text served a linking function similar to what is seen in hypertext.

Diagram of several documents connected by hyperlinks

Hypertext cross-references take the form of "live" references within the text that, when activated by mouse click, touch, voice command or other means, immediately makes available the referenced content, which might be a different part of the same document, or another document entirely.

Related concepts exist within computer science. In programming, "cross-referencing" means the listing of every file name and line number where a given named identifier occurs within the program's source tree. In a relational database management system, a table can have an xref as prefix or suffix to indicate it is a cross-reference table that joins two or more tables together via primary key.
