= PTC Integrity =

Software system lifecycle management and application lifecycle management platform

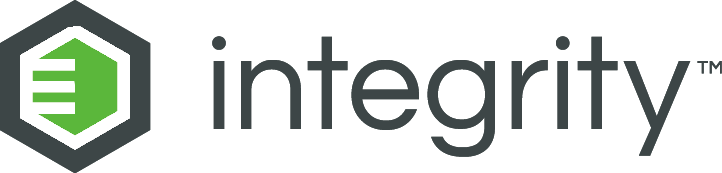
- Developer: PTC, Inc.
- Release: July 2001; 25 years ago
- Stable release: 11.1 / March 30, 2017; 9 years ago
- Written in: Java
- Operating system: Unix-like, Windows
- Type: ALM, RM, SCM, Quality, Agile, SysEng
- License: Trialware
- Website: ptc.com

PTC Integrity Lifecycle Manager (formerly MKS Integrity) is a software system lifecycle management (SSLM) and application lifecycle management (ALM) platform developed by MKS Inc. and was first released in 2001. The software is client/server, with both desktop (java/swing) and web client interfaces. It provides software development organizations with an environment in which they can manage the end-to-end processes of development.

== Overview ==
MKS Integrity is now a PTC product since the acquisition of MKS Inc., which was completed on May 31, 2011, by PTC.

PTC Integrity Lifecycle Manager is built around a single repository. This single-repository solution supports the three pillars of lifecycle management—traceability, process automation, and reporting and analytics and some companies may see additional value in this approach.

Integration of PTC Integrity Lifecycle Manager with IDEs and other development tools is—out-of-the-box—limited to a few products. Supported IDEs include Eclipse and Visual Studio. Also supported are IBM i and Apache Maven.

== History ==
PTC Integrity Lifecycle Manager was previously known under different brands, including MKS Source, MKS Integrity Manager, Implementer (for IBM i), and others. These were consolidated under a single brand, with the release of MKS Integrity 2007 in July 2007, which was acquired by PTC and finally renamed PTC Integrity in 2011. PTC retired the Integrity brand and rebranded Integrity to Windchill starting in July 2019.
