= Rational Synergy =

Configuration management software

- Original authors: CaseWare, Inc.
- Developer: Rational Software
- Initial release: 1990; 36 years ago
- Stable release: 7.2.2.2 / February 8, 2021; 5 years ago
- Written in: ACcent, Java
- Operating system: AIX, HP-UX, Linux, Windows
- Type: Software configuration management
- License: Proprietary (IBM EULA)
- Website: www.ibm.com/products/rational-synergy

Rational Synergy is a software tool that provides software configuration management (SCM) capabilities for all artifacts related to software development including source code, documents and images as well as the final built software executable and libraries. Rational Synergy also provides the repository for the change management tool known as Rational Change. Together these two tools form an integrated configuration management and change management environment that is used in software development organizations that need controlled SCM processes and an understanding of what is in a build of their software.

The name Synergy refers to its database level integration with Change Management that provides views into what is in a build in terms of defects.

== History ==
Synergy began in 1988 as a research project for computer-aided software engineering by software developer Pete Orelup at Computers West of Irvine, California. Computers West was supporting itself through contract software development and an application for finance and insurance at automobile dealerships on the Pick OS.

In 1989, the company decided to pursue development of a software configuration management and revision control product, renamed itself CaseWare, Inc., and hired three more developers. The system was re-imagined as a platform for building SCM systems running on Unix (Sun Solaris).

It was decided that a compiled language such as C++ was not sufficiently flexible, reliable, and productive, and so a new programming language called ACcent was created. ACcent has many features similar to Java, but pre-dates it by five years. It has a compiler that compiles to machine-independent byte-codes, and a virtual machine execution environment with automatic memory management. Except for the compiler and execution environment, the entire Amplify Control product was written in the ACcent language, including a scalable, networked client-server architecture and use of a SQL database with a schema flexible enough to allow customer extension of the built-in data types in ACcent without changes to the physical schema.

CaseWare Amplify Control also included a distributed build automation and continuous integration system, much like today's Maven and Hudson tools. It was first released in 1990. Later a bug tracking system was also built on the platform.

The company was somewhat successful, but lacked experienced leadership and started to lose market share to IBM DevOps Code ClearCase. In 1991 the company was nearly broke and the original developers walked out en masse. A new CEO was brought in, and the company was relaunched, although without the developers. Both CaseWare and Amplify Control were renamed Continuus Software in 1993.

By 1997 Continuus was approaching 100m in revenue and expanded into Europe, eventually opening a help desk office in Ireland with the intention of eventually providing 24x7 support to the Fortune 500. It considered the Rational Clearcase product line as its competitor in the Engineering and Scientific market and Platinum Harvest as its competitor on Wall Street. It began to recruit CM people as sales engineers out of its client base at this point from clients.

The fears over the Y2K bug was a profitable motivator for clients to buy SCM products such as Continuus at this point. Smaller organizations that grew too large for Visual Sourcesafe and PVCS looked to "move up" as they "got religion" after realizing that they were missing code, stomping on each other's changes or not having enough workflow to be able to run smoothly. One of Continuus' major selling points at this time was Task Based CM, a customization that one of their major clients (Tandem Computer) had requested which they had rolled into the main product. This turned into a major selling point over Rational Clearcase which still needed major add-on professional services work to adapt to a customer's workflow and methodology.

Continuus tried with mixed success to jump on the .com bandwagon as well. During this period with the VP of Engineering looked at getting things to work under Tomcat using servlets and a "light" version of the middleware process which was known as the "engine process". This eventually became part of the product suite which was renamed CM/Synergy and PT/Synergy. After getting Continuus to run its Informix database and server processes on Windows Server, an integration with Visual Studio was added to make Continuus look like Visual Sourcesafe to the IDE. Walt Disney bought into the product as it addressed its Y2K issues. US Internetworking (USi) became the "largest single transaction" in early 1999.

Other companies that were clients at this point included Remedy (help desk software), Signet Bank, Bank of America, SAIC (including a rather bizarre collaboration with the Web development company that created the Dr. Ruth sex site), and Novell.

On July 29, 1999, Continuus Software announced a public offering listing its stock on the NASDAQ Stock Market. In October 2000, the Swedish software company Telelogic, agreed to purchase Continuus Software in a deal worth $42 million. Under Telelogic, Continuus was renamed Synergy. It had also recently acquired QSS and the DOORS product line. As a result, in the summer of 2001, it decided to lay off the entire Continuus Professional Services organization staff, reasoning that the QSS services folk would be able to support both products. That strategy didn't work out so well, and some of the ex-services folk were able to find consulting jobs with Continuus clients. In 2008 IBM announced that it had purchased Telelogic. Synergy was added to the IBM's Rational Software family of SCM tools and named Rational Synergy. In 2021 IBM anncounced the withdrawal and support discontinuance of Rational Synergy and Rational Change.
