= Vesta (software configuration management) =

Vesta is a software configuration management system developed in the 1990s.

== History ==
Vesta was developed by researchers at the Digital Equipment Corporation (DEC) Systems Research Center in Palo Alto, California. The language for Vesta was first published in 1993. Vesta's approach to incremental software building was to give the user a language to describe how to build the software, and let the builder infer dependencies, unlike other systems where the user specifies the dependencies explicitly. A redesign and reimplementation called Vesta-2 was begun around 1998. Vesta was released by Compaq after it acquired DEC, under the GNU Lesser General Public License (LGPL) in 2001.

Vesta features include:

- A guarantee of precise build repeatability. Vesta builds are encapsulated in an environment cut off from the normal filesystem. They cannot use any files, settings, or other inputs that aren't under revision control.
- Completely automatic dependency detection. The Vesta builder records file accesses made during builds, rather than having the user explicitly specify as with the earlier Make tool.
- A shared build cache. When multiple developers are using the system, they share the same pool of previously completed build work for re-use in future incremental builds. This saves time and resources across development teams.

Vesta is used by Intel for microprocessor development projects. They employ developers who actively work on the maintenance and development of Vesta.

Drawbacks include:

- Mandatory locking at the package level.
- Users connect to a special NFS server to access the repository.

A short book about Vesta was published several times through 2011.
