= GNU Bazaar =

Version control system

- Original author: Martin Pool
- Developers: Canonical and community
- Release: 26 March 2005; 21 years ago
- Final release: 2.7.0 / 15 February 2016
- Written in: Python 2, Pyrex (optional), C
- Operating system: Cross-platform
- Successor: Breezy
- Type: Distributed and Client–server revision control system
- License: GPL-2.0-or-later
- Website: ~~https://bazaar.canonical.com/~~
- Repository: launchpad.net/bzr

GNU Bazaar (formerly Bazaar-NG, command line tool bzr) is a distributed and client–server revision control system formerly sponsored by Canonical.

Bazaar can be used by a single developer working on multiple branches of local content, or by teams collaborating across a network.

Bazaar is written in the Python programming language, with packages for major Linux distributions, Mac OS X and Microsoft Windows. Bazaar is free software and in 2008 became part of the GNU Project. It was used by Canonical for their Launchpad code hosting website. The last release was in 2016. In 2025, Canonical announced that it would stop hosting Bazaar repositories on Launchpad. Breezy is a fork of Bazaar.

== See also ==
- Breezy
- Distributed version control
- Comparison of version-control software
- Comparison of source-code-hosting facilities
- The Cathedral and the Bazaar (source of the name)
