= Merger doctrine =

The phrase merger doctrine or doctrine of merger may refer to one of several legal doctrines:

- Merger doctrine (antitrust law)
- Merger doctrine (civil procedure)
- Merger doctrine (copyright law)
- Merger doctrine (criminal law)
- Merger doctrine (family law)
- Merger doctrine (property law)
- Merger doctrine (trust law)
