= Comparison of file comparison tools =

This article compares computer software tools that compare files, and in many cases directories or folders, whether it is their main purpose or as part of more general file management.

== General ==
Basic general information about file comparison software.

Name	Creator	FOSS	Free	First public release date	Year of latest stable version	Windows	Macintosh	Linux	Other platforms	Max supported file size
Beyond Compare	Scooter Software	No; Proprietary	No	1996	2026-11-10 (v5.2.8)	Yes	Yes	Yes		> 2GB (64 bits)
Compare++	Coode Software	No; Proprietary	No	2010	2016-7-17 (3.0.1.0b)	Yes	No	No		
diff, diff3	AT&T	Yes; BSD 3-clause, BSD 4-clause, CDDL, GPL, Proprietary	Yes	1974		No	Yes (Mac OS X)	Yes	ported to most platforms as part of SCCS	> 2GB but less than 64 bits
Eclipse (compare)		Yes; Eclipse Public License	Yes	2004-07-21	2016-09-28 (4.6.1 (Neon.1))	Yes	Yes	Yes	Anything with Java	
Ediff	Michael Kifer	Yes; GPL	Yes	1994	2.81.4	Yes (Note: Ediff requires a diff utility to function. As of December 2017, diff is not bundled with Emacs or Windows, so use of Ediff in a Windows environment requires installation of both Emacs and a diff implementation like GNU diff.)	Yes (Mac OS X)	Yes	Anything with Emacs and diff	
ExamDiff Pro	PrestoSoft	No; Proprietary	No	1998	2026-11-22 (Build 17.0.2.7)	Yes (WinXP and up)	Yes (in Wine)	Yes (in Wine)		
Far Manager (compare)	Eugene Roshal (original); FAR Group	Yes; Revised BSD license	Yes	1996	2022-02-02 (v3.0 build 5959)	Yes	No	No	There's a beta-version of far2l, a Linux fork of FAR Manager v2 which also works on OSX/MacOS and BSD.	
fc	Microsoft	No; Proprietary	Yes; Part of OS	1987		Yes (DOS)	No	No		
FileMerge (aka opendiff)	Apple Inc.	No; Proprietary	Yes; (part of Apple Developer Tools)	1993 (part of NEXTSTEP 3.2)	2014 (v2.8)	No	Yes (Mac OS X)	No		
FreeFileSync[data missing]	Zenju	Yes; GPLv3	Yes	2008	2023-10-23 (v13.2)	Yes	Yes	Yes		
IntelliJ IDEA (compare)	JetBrains	No; Proprietary	No	2001	2019-08-20 (2019.2.1)	Yes	Yes	Yes		
jEdit JDiff plugin	Various	Yes; GPL	Yes	1998	2020-09-03 (5.6.0)	Yes	Yes	Yes	Anything with Java	
Lazarus Diff	Lazarus (software)	Yes; GPL	Yes	2000	2020-07-11 (2.0.10)	Yes	Yes	Yes	FreeBSD	
Meld	Stephen Kennedy	Yes; GPLv2+	Yes	2002	2024-03-24 (3.22.2)	Yes	Yes	Yes	BSD, Solaris	
Notepad++ (compare)	Various	Yes; GPLv3	Yes	2009	2015-01-06 (1.5.6.6)	Yes	No	No		
Perforce P4Merge	Perforce	No; Proprietary	Yes		2019 (2019.1/1815056)	Yes	Yes	Yes	Sun Solaris	
Pretty Diff	Austin Cheney	Yes; MIT-compatible	Yes	2009	2019-09-02 (101.2.6)	Yes (Web)	Yes (Web)	Yes (Web)	Node.js	
Tkdiff	Tkdiff	Yes; GPLv2+	Yes	2003 (or before)	2021-03-24 (v5.2.1)	Yes (Tcl)	Yes (Tcl)	Yes (Tcl)	Anything with Tcl	
Total Commander (compare)	Christian Ghisler	No; Proprietary	No		2020-03-25 (v9.51)	Yes	No	No		
twdiff (TextWrangler Diff Helper)[data missing]	Bare Bones Software, Inc.	No; Proprietary	Yes; with TextWrangler		2012 (1.0 (v22))	No	Yes	No	No	
vimdiff	Bram Moolenaar et al.	Yes; GPL-compatible	Yes	2001	2016-10-03 (v8.0.0022)	Yes	Yes	Yes	Anything with vim	
WinDiff	Microsoft	No; Proprietary	Yes; Part of Platform SDK	1992	2010-05-14 (v6.1.7716.0)	Yes	No	No	No	
WinMerge	Dean Grimm	Yes; GPL	Yes	1998	2026-04-27 (v2.16.56)	Yes (Win95 and up)	Yes (in wine)	Yes (in wine)		2 GB
KDiff3[data missing] (part of KDE SDK, as well as a plug-in to KDE Dolphin file manager)	Joachim Eibl and KDE SDK KDiff3 Team	Yes GPL v2	Yes	<2004 (v0.9.86)	2023-01-13 (v1.10)	Yes as part of KDevelop KDE SDK download site or from Windows store or KDE download site (most recent version) as separate application.	Yes Can be downloaded from KDE SDK download site or as separate stand-alone application from KDE download site	Yes Install from your Linux distribution repositories, or as AppStream, from , or as GIT project KDE Gitlab or from/on .	Any other Unix with KDE/KF5, Qt5 and CMake, e.g. FreeBSD & NetBSD	?
Name	Creator	FOSS	Free	First public release date	Year of latest stable version	Windows	Macintosh	Linux	Other platforms	Max supported file size

== Compare features ==
Name	Show in-line changes	Directory comparison	Binary comparison	Moved lines	3-way comparison	Merge	Structured comparison (Note: Compare logical sections (class, methods).)	Manual compare alignment	Image compare
Beyond Compare	Yes	Yes	Yes	Yes	Yes (Files and Folders)	Yes (Pro only)		Yes	Yes
Compare++	Yes	Yes			Yes	Yes	Yes (C/C++, C#, Java, JavaScript, CSS3)		
diff	No	Yes	Partial	No	No	No			
diff3	No	No			Yes (non-optional)				
Eclipse (compare)	Yes				No (only ancestor)	Yes		No	
Ediff	Yes	Yes	Yes		Yes	Yes			
ExamDiff Pro	Yes	Yes	Yes	Yes	Yes (ExamDiff Pro Master only)	Yes		manual synchronization	
Far Manager (compare)	Yes (Via plugin)	Yes	Yes	Yes (Via plugin)	No	No			
fc	No	No	Yes		No	No			
FileMerge (aka opendiff)	Yes	Yes	Yes		Yes (optional ancestor)	Yes			
IntelliJ IDEA (compare)	Yes	Yes	Yes	No	Yes	Yes		Yes	Yes
jEdit JDiff plugin	Yes				No	Yes			
Lazarus Diff									
Meld	Yes	Yes	No	No	Yes	Yes		line alignment, unlink scroll	
Notepad++ (compare)	Yes	No	No	Yes	No	No	No		
Perforce P4Merge	Yes	No	No		Yes	Yes			Yes
Pretty Diff	Yes	Yes	No	No	No	No	Yes	No	
Tkdiff	Yes	No	No	No	No	No			
Total Commander (compare)	Yes	Yes	Yes	No	No	Yes	No	resync comparison	No
vimdiff	Yes	Yes (via DirDiff plugin)			Yes	Yes			
WinDiff	Yes	Yes	Yes	Yes	No	No			
WinMerge	Yes	Yes	Yes	Yes (via Options)	Yes	Yes		Yes	Yes
Name	Show in-line changes	Directory comparison	Binary comparison	Moved lines	3-way comparison	Merge	Structured comparison	Manual compare alignment	Image compare

== API / editor features ==
Name	GUI	CLI	Scripting	Horizontal / vertical	Syntax highlighting	Reports
Beyond Compare	Yes	Yes	Yes	Both	Yes	XML, HTML, CSV, Text, Unix Patch
Compare++	Yes	Yes		Both	Yes	HTML, Text(combined or side-by-side)
diff	No	Yes		Horizontal	Yes pipe to diff-highlight	
diff3	No	Yes		Horizontal		
Eclipse (compare)	Yes			Vertical	Yes	
Ediff	Yes	Yes	elisp	Both	Yes	
ExamDiff Pro	Yes	Yes		optional	Yes	UNIX, HTML, Diff
Far Manager (compare)	Yes	Yes	Yes		Yes	No
fc	No	Yes		Horizontal		
FileMerge (aka opendiff)	Yes	Yes		Vertical	Yes	No
IntelliJ IDEA (compare)	Yes	Yes		Vertical	Yes	
jEdit JDiff plugin	Yes			Both	Yes	
Lazarus Diff	Yes				Yes	
Meld	Yes	No			Yes	No
Notepad++ (compare)	Yes	Yes		Both	Yes	No
Perforce P4Merge	Yes	Yes		Vertical	Yes	No
Pretty Diff	Yes	Yes	JavaScript	Both	Yes	XHTML
Tkdiff	Yes					
Total Commander (compare)	Yes			Both	No	No
vimdiff	Yes	Yes	vim script	Both	Yes	HTML
WinDiff	Yes	Yes		Horizontal	No	Text
WinMerge	Yes	Yes		Both	Yes	CSV, Tab-delimited, HTML, XML
Name	GUI	CLI	Scripting	Horizontal / vertical	Syntax highlighting	Reports

== Other features ==
Some other features which did not fit in previous table

Name	ZIP support	FTP support	SFTP support	Version control browsing	Patch creation	Patch application	Patch preview	Unicode support	XML-aware
Beyond Compare	Yes	Yes	Yes	SVN	Yes	Yes	Yes	Yes	
Compare++				SVN, CVS, Git, Microsoft TFS, Perforce, VSS using command line				Yes	
diff	No	No		No	Yes	Yes with patch	Yes with patch	No	No
diff3	No	No							No
Eclipse (compare)				Yes CVS, Subversion, Git, Mercurial, Baazar				Yes	
Ediff	Yes	Yes		RCS, CVS, SVN, Mercurial, git (anything supported by Emacs' VC-mode)	Yes	Yes	Yes		
ExamDiff Pro	Yes	Yes			normal diff only			Yes	
Far Manager (compare)	No	No		No	No	No	No	Yes	No
fc	No	No			No				
FileMerge (aka opendiff)	No	supported by OS			No			No	No
IntelliJ IDEA (compare)	Yes	Yes	Yes	Yes	Yes	Yes	Yes	Yes	
jEdit JDiff plugin	Yes	Yes		Yes	Yes	Yes	Yes	Yes	
Lazarus Diff									
Meld				CVS, Subversion, Git, Mercurial, Baazar	Yes			Yes	
Notepad++ (compare)	No	Yes		Git, Subversion (compare against base)	No	No	No	Yes	No
Perforce P4Merge				No				Yes	
Pretty Diff	No	No	No	No	No	No	No	Yes	Yes
Tkdiff	No	No		CVS, RCS, Subversion	No	No	No	No	No
Total Commander (compare)	Yes	Yes	Yes	No	No	No	No	Yes	No
vimdiff	Yes	Yes			Yes			Yes	
WinDiff	No	No			No			No	
WinMerge	Yes	No		Mercurial, Subversion, Visual Source Safe, Rational ClearCase	Yes			Yes	
Name	ZIP support	FTP support	SFTP support	Version control browsing	Patch creation	Patch application	Patch preview	Unicode support	XML-aware

== Aspects ==
What aspects can be / are compared?

Name	Filename casing	CRC	Filedate	Daylight saving	Character casing
Beyond Compare	Yes	Yes	Yes	Yes	Yes
Compare++	Yes	Yes	Yes		Yes
diff	Yes	No	No	No	Optional
diff3					
Eclipse (compare)					
Ediff					
ExamDiff Pro	No	Yes	Yes	Yes	Yes
Far Manager (compare)	Yes	No	Yes	No	Yes
fc	No				Optional
FileMerge (aka opendiff)	No	No	No		Optional
IntelliJ IDEA (compare)					
jEdit JDiff plugin					
Lazarus Diff					
Meld					
Notepad++ (compare)	No	No	No		Yes
Perforce P4Merge	—N/a	No	No	No	Yes
Pretty Diff	—N/a	No	No	No	Optional
Tkdiff					
Total Commander (compare)			Optional	Yes (in synchronize only)	Optional
vimdiff	No	No	No	No	Yes
WinDiff	No	No	when different	Yes	Optional
WinMerge	No	No	Optional	No	Optional
Name	Filename casing	CRC	Filedate	Daylight saving	Character casing

== Time zone effects ==
When files are transferred across time zones and between Microsoft FAT and NTFS file systems, the timestamp displayed by the same file may change, so that identical files with different storage histories are deemed different by a comparer that requires the timestamps to match. The difference is an exact number of quarters of an hour up to 95 (same minutes modulo 15 and seconds) if the file was transported across zones; there is also a one-hour difference within a single zone caused by the transition between standard time and daylight saving time (DST). Some, but not all, file comparison and synchronisation software can be configured to ignore the DST and time-zone differences. (Note: Example: "Beyond Compare" help describes a user setting "timezone differences – ignores timestamp differences that are multiples of an exact hour.") Software known to have daylight-saving compensation is marked in the Aspects table.

== See also ==
- File comparison
- File synchronization
- Comparison of file synchronization software
- List of disk cloning software
- Comparison of disk cloning software
- Comparison of hex editors
