= Merge =

Merge or merger may refer to:

== Concepts ==
- Merge (traffic), the reduction of the number of lanes on a road
- Merge (linguistics), a basic syntactic operation in generative syntax in the Minimalist Program
- Merger (politics), the combination of two or more political or administrative entities
- Merger (phonology), phonological change whereby originally separate phonemes come to be pronounced exactly the same
- Mergers and acquisitions, the buying, selling, dividing and combining of different companies

== Arts, entertainment, and media ==
- Merger (band), a 1970s English reggae band
- Merging (play), a 2007 one act play written by Charles Messina
- Merge Records, an indie-rock record label based in Chapel Hill, North Carolina
- "Merger" (The Office), a 2002 television episode
- Merge, a program broadcast by Lifetime
- The Merge, a 2025 novel by Grace Walker
- "The Merger" (Dilbert episode), an episode of the Dilbert TV series
- "The Merger" (The Office), an episode of the American TV series The Office
- The Merger (film), 2018 Australian comedy/drama film
- "The Merger", an episode of Survivor: Borneo

== Computer science ==
- Merge (version control), to combine simultaneously changed files in revision control
- Merge (software), a Virtual Machine Monitor computer package for running MS-DOS or Windows 9x on x86 processors under UNIX
- Merge (SQL), a statement in SQL
- Merge algorithm, an algorithm for combining two or more sorted lists into a single sorted one
- Mail merge, the production of multiple documents from a single template form and a structured data source
- Randomness merger, a function which combines several, perhaps correlated, random variables into one high-entropy random variable

== Other uses ==
- Merger (horse) (born 1965), Canadian Thoroughbred racehorse
- ME Research UK, formerly MERGE, a UK charity funding biomedical research into Chronic fatigue syndrome
- Mérges, a place in Hungary

== See also ==
- Merger doctrine (disambiguation)
- Combine (disambiguation)
