= Edit conflict =

Computer problem

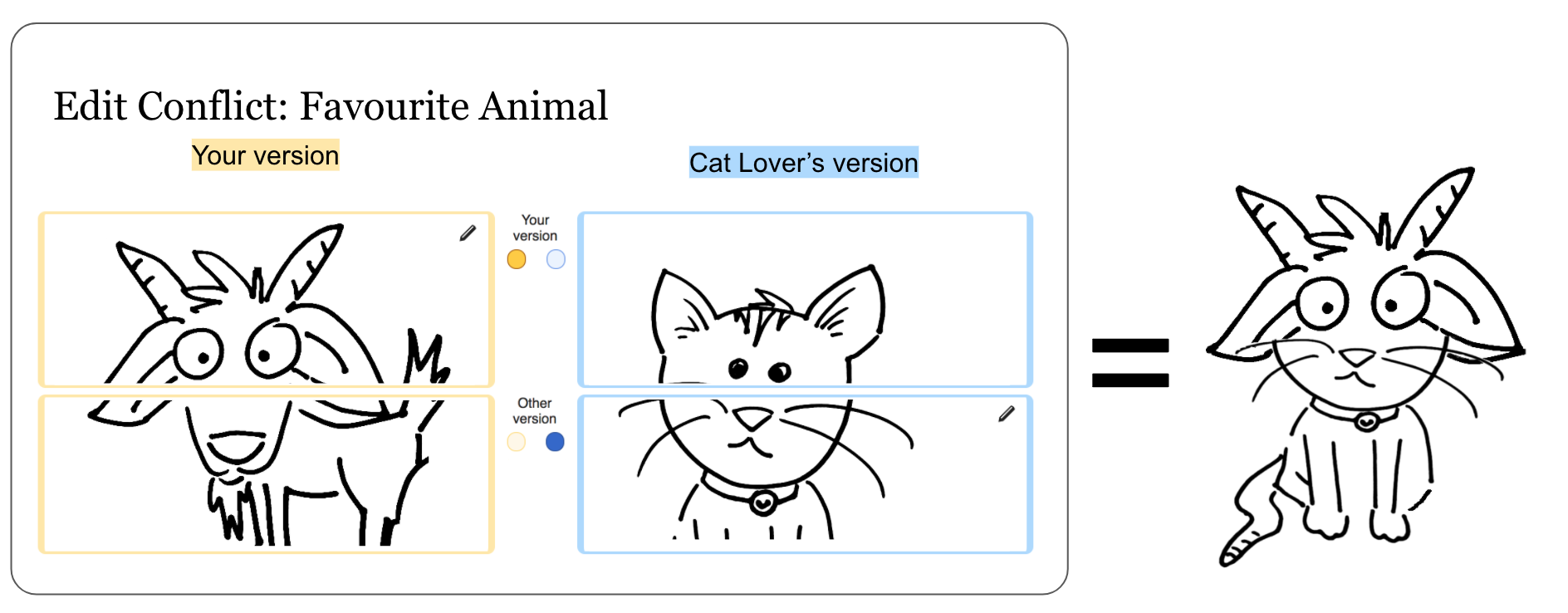
A representation of an edit conflict. To resolve the conflict, the goat lover must choose whether to keep their changes or merge them with the cat lover's.

An edit conflict is a computer problem that may occur when multiple editors edit the same file and cannot merge without losing part or all of their edit. The conflict occurs when an editor gets a copy of a shared document file, changes the copy and attempts to save the changes to the original file, which has been altered by another editor after the copy was obtained.

== Resolution ==
The simplest way to resolve an edit conflict is to ignore intervening edits and overwrite the current file. This may lead to a substantial loss of information, and alternative methods are often employed to resolve or prevent conflicts:

- Manual resolution, where the editor determines which version to retain and may manually incorporate edits into the current version of the file.
- Store backups or file comparisons of each edit, so the previous versions of the file can still be accessed once the original is overwritten.
- File locking, which limits the file to one editor at a time to prevent edit conflicts. Computer writer Gary B. Shelly notes that many wiki systems "will block the contributor who is attempting to edit the page from being able to do so until the contributor currently editing the page saves changes or remains idle on the page for an extended period of time."
- Merge, by determining if the edits are in unrelated parts of the file and combining without user intervention.

== Occurrences ==
The problem is encountered on heavily edited articles in wikis (frequency higher in articles related to a current event or person), distributed data systems (e.g., Google Sites), and revision control systems not using file locking, as well as other high-traffic pages. If a significant amount of new text is involved, the editor who receives an "edit conflict" error message can cut and paste the new text into a word processor or similar program for further editing, or can paste that text directly into a newer version of the target document. Simple copyediting can be done directly on the newer version, and then saved.

== See also ==
- Concurrent Versions System
- Apache Subversion
- Git (software)
