= Meld (software) =

GNOME visual diff and merge tool

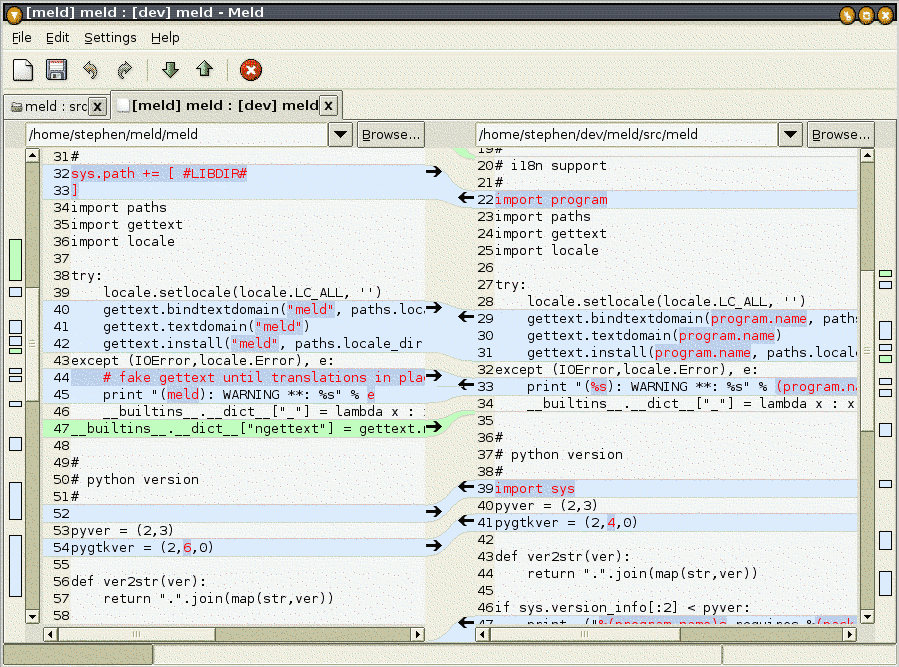
- Meld 3.x.y performing a file comparison
- Original authors: Stephen Kennedy, Kai Willadsen, Vincent Legoll
- Developer: The GNOME Project
- Release: August 8, 2002; 24 years ago
- Stable release: 3.24.0 / June 20, 2026; 3 months ago
- Written in: Python, PyGTK/PyGObject
- Operating system: Linux and Unix-like, macOS, Windows
- Type: Diff viewer
- License: GPL-2.0-or-later
- Website: meldmerge.org, gitlab.gnome.org/GNOME/meld/-/wikis/home
- Repository: gitlab.gnome.org/GNOME/meld.git

Meld is a visual diff and merge tool, targeted at developers. It allows users to compare two or three files or directories visually, color-coding the different lines.

Meld can be used for comparing files, directories, and version controlled repositories. It provides two- and three-way comparison of both files and directories, and supports many version control systems including Git, Mercurial, Bazaar, CVS and Subversion.

Meld is free and open-source software subject to the terms of the GNU General Public License (GPL-2.0-or-later).

== Requirements ==
Requirements for Meld 3.22.2:

- Python 3.4
- GTK+ 3.20
- GLib 2.36
- PyGObject 3.20
- GtkSourceView 3.20
- pycairo

== Port to GTK 4 ==
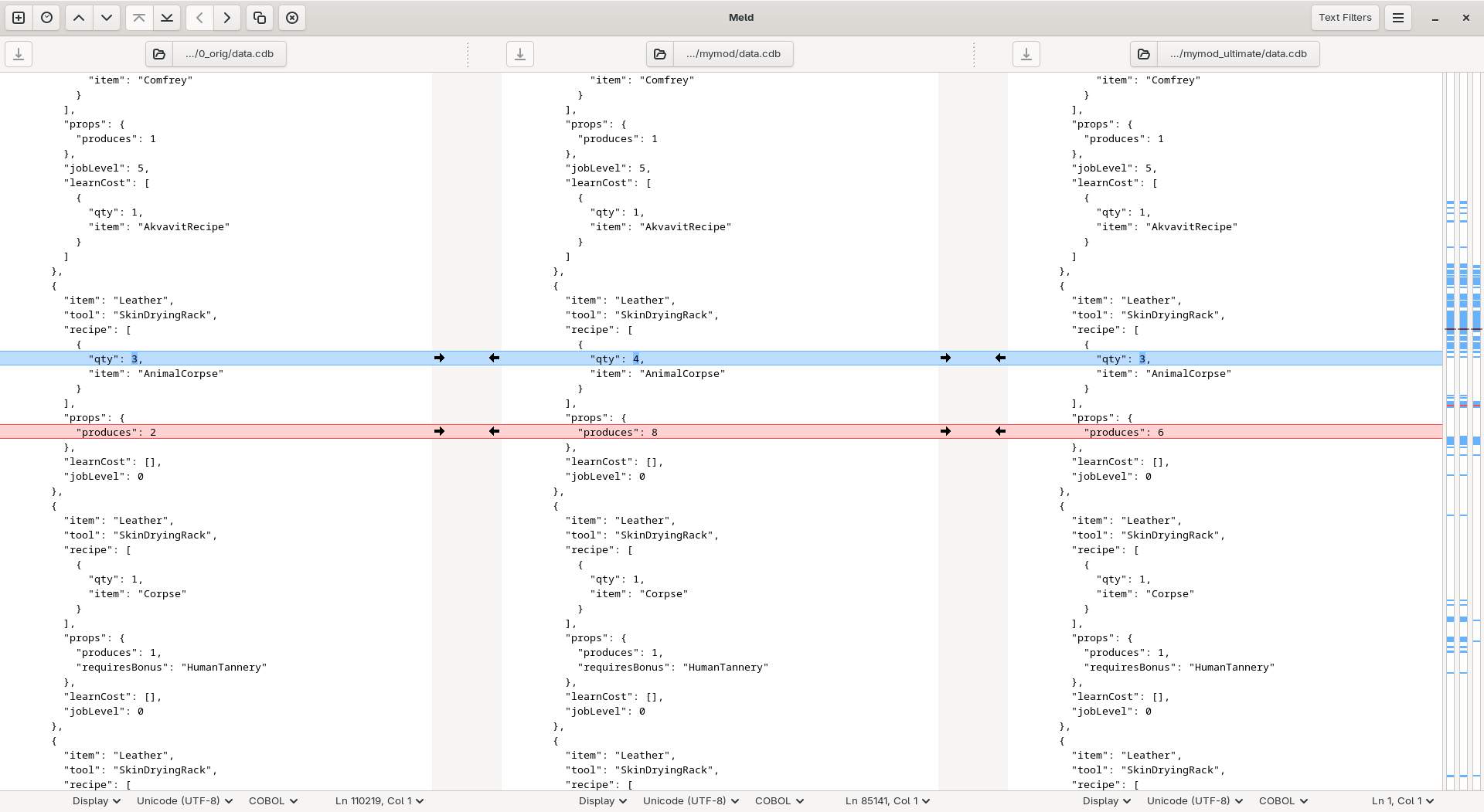
Meld 3.23.1 is the last version to use GTK 3.

As of April 2026, a port to GTK 4 is in development, with partial window state tracking for GTK 4 having been implemented since 2023.

== See also ==
- Comparison of file comparison tools
