= Comp (command) =

Command

comp
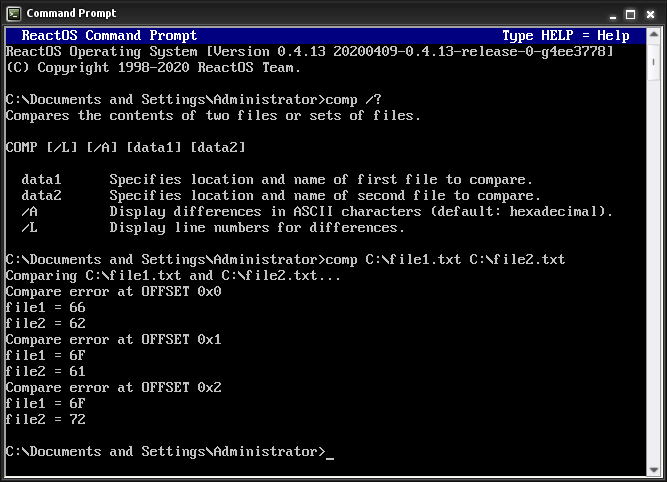
- The ReactOS comp command
- Developers: DEC, IBM, Microsoft, Digital Research, Novell, Paul Vojta, ReactOS Contributors
- Initial release: August 1981; 44 years ago
- Operating system: OS/8, PC DOS, MS-DOS, FlexOS, SISNE plus, OS/2, eComStation, ArcaOS, Windows, DR DOS, FreeDOS, ReactOS
- Platform: Cross-platform
- Type: Command
- License: FreeDOS: MIT; ReactOS: GNU GPL 2

In computing, comp is a command used on DEC OS/8, DOS, DR FlexOS, IBM OS/2, Microsoft Windows and related computer operating systems such as ReactOS. It is used to perform comparisons of multiple computer files to show the differences between them.

== History ==
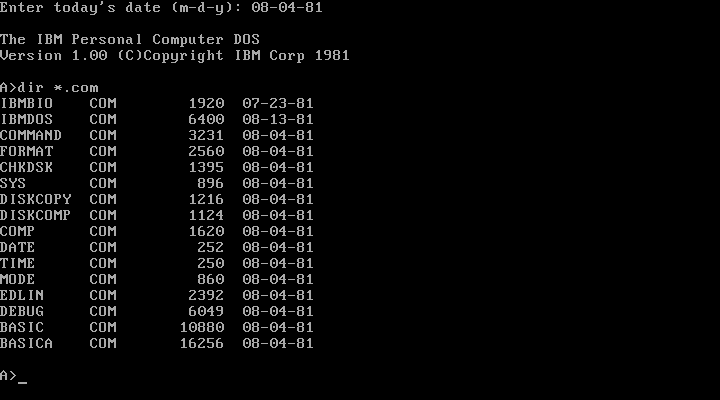
COMP.COM (among other commands) in IBM PC DOS 1.0.

In DOS, the comp command first appeared in PC DOS 1.0 and has been included in most versions of MS-DOS and PC DOS. A newer command, fc was added in DOS 3.3 which allows for line comparisons in addition to binary comparisons. DR DOS 6.0 also includes an implementation of the comp command.

The FreeDOS version was developed by Paul Vojta and is licensed under the MIT License. Ged Murphy developed the ReactOS version. It is licensed under the GNU GPL 2.

The command is also available in the EFI shell.

== Syntax ==
The command-syntax is:

comp [<Data1>] [<Data2>] [/d] [/a] [/l] [/n=<Number>] [/c]

=== Parameters ===
- <Data1> – Location and name of the first file or set of files
- <Data2> – Location and name of the second file or set of files
- /d – Display differences in decimal format (Default is hexadecimal)
- /a – Display differences as characters
- /l – Display the number of the line, instead of the byte offset
- /n=<Number> – Compare only the specified number of lines for each file
- /c – Perform a non case-sensitive comparison
- /off[line] – Process files with the offline attribute set
- /? – Display Help

== See also ==
- Data comparison
- List of DOS commands
- diff
