= Compare++ =

Source code file comparison tool

Compare++ is an auxiliary source code file comparison tool for Microsoft Windows that can structurally compare, merge, and synchronize text files or directories. It was developed by Coode Software.

== Features ==
Compare++ includes the following features:

- Data comparison, side-by-side highlighted comparison, smart code diff, and directory synchronization
- Ignoration of comment, newline, and pure format changes
- Visual comparison of similar functions via tree structures
- Alignment and comparison of file subsections such as C++ functions and classes
- In-place editing and comparing of files
- Ability to explore containing folders for easy navigation and reference
- Integration with other products such as revision control systems
- Command line interface

== See also ==
- Comparison of file comparison tools
