= Pretty Diff =

- Developer(s): Austin Cheney
- Initial release: March 3, 2009; 16 years ago
- Stable release: 101.0.0 / April 21, 2019; 6 years ago
- Repository: github.com/prettydiff/prettydiff
- Written in: TypeScript
- Platform: Web platform
- Type: Data comparison, prettification, minification
- License: CC0
- Website: prettydiff.com

Pretty Diff is a language-aware data comparison utility implemented in TypeScript. The online utility is capable of source code prettification, minification, and comparison of two pieces of input text. It operates by removing code comments from supported languages and then performs a pretty-print operation prior to executing the diff algorithm. An abbreviated list of unit tests is provided. The documentation claims the JavaScript pretty-print operation conforms to the requirements of JSLint.

As Pretty Diff is written entirely in TypeScript, the application executes in a web browser or on command line using a stand-alone JavaScript interpreter, such as Node.js.

As of March 23, 2016 Pretty Diff stated it would abandon NPM in response to a list of disagreements. On April 18, 2016 in parallel to the release of Pretty Diff version 2.0.0. the NPM package is updated to artificial version 99 where it is effectively locked into version 1.16.37.

The source code is published at the Pretty Diff GitHub repository.

== Alternatives ==
- JS Diff Lib - Diff tool written in JavaScript
- JS Beautify - HTML and JavaScript beautification
- JSMin - Minifier for JavaScript written in JavaScript
- CSSmin - Minifier for CSS
- Google Closure Compiler - Minifier for CSS, JavaScript, and HTML.

== See also ==
- Comparison of file comparison tools - Diff tools
- Diff
- Obfuscated code
- Longest common subsequence problem
- Markup language
- Levenshtein distance
