= Tkdiff =

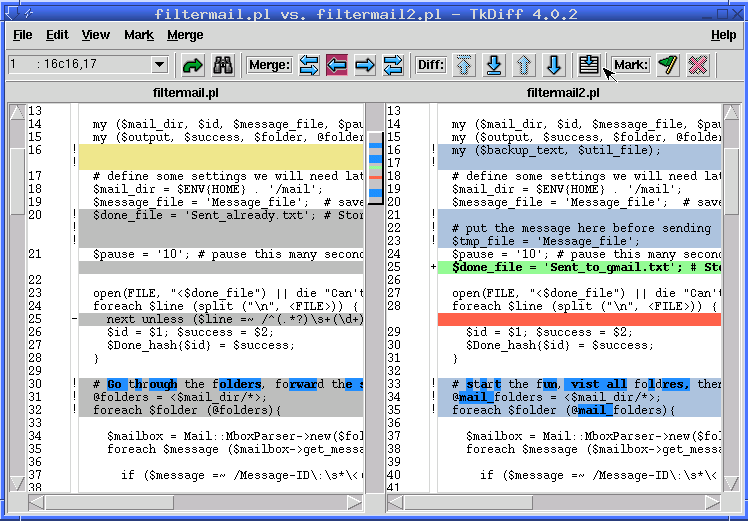
tkdiff uses colors to suggest differences between files and within shared lines.

tkdiff is a graphical diff viewer based on the Tk framework. It is capable of inter-operating with source-control systems like CVS and Subversion to show the differences between the local copy and the repository version. Such a line-by-line comparison is often considered to be good software engineering practice before committing code changes.

Tkdiff highlight specific differences within a line shared by both files, rather than simply indicating that the whole line differs.

== Example usage ==
- tkdiff <file1> <file2> — to compare the two files <file1> and <file2>
- tkdiff <file> — to compare the local version of the given file to the most recent version in the CVS/Subversion repository

tkdiff can also compare two older revisions of a file, etc.
