= Size =

Magnitude or dimension of a thing

A diagram comparing the size of an average human diver to the size of the modern great white shark, whale shark, and the prehistoric megalodon. The illustration also contains a linear measurement in meters in the middle.

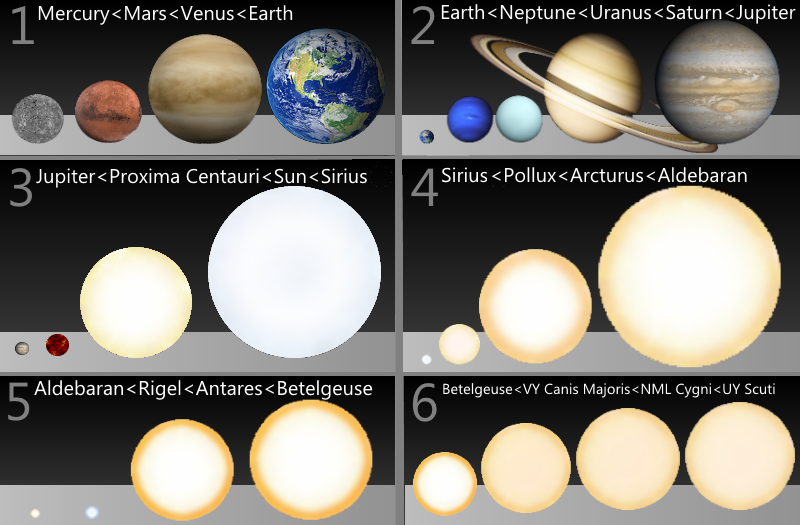
A size comparison illustration comparing the sizes of various planets and stars. In each grouping after the first, the last object from the previous group is presented as the first object of the following group, to present a continuous sense of comparison.

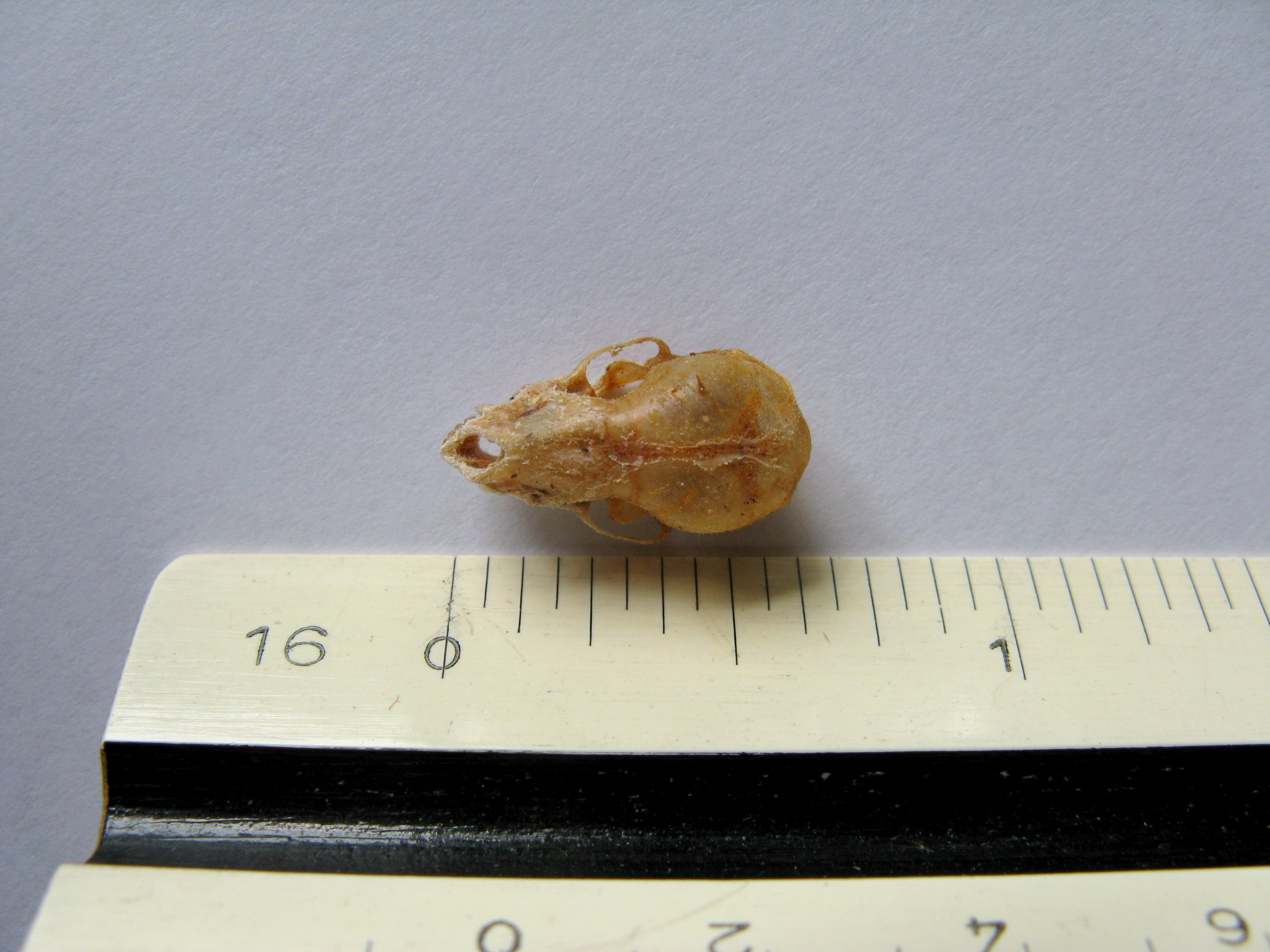
A bat skull next to a ruler used to measure size. Size: 7 mm (0.28 in)

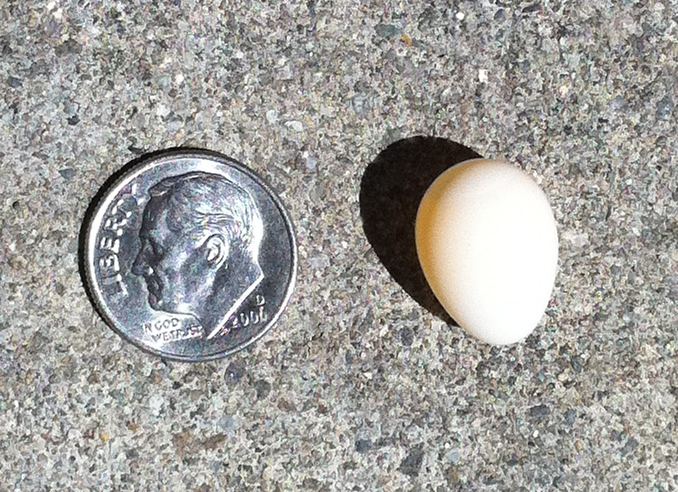
A finch egg next to a dime; a person familiar with the size of a dime would thereby have a sense of the size of the egg.

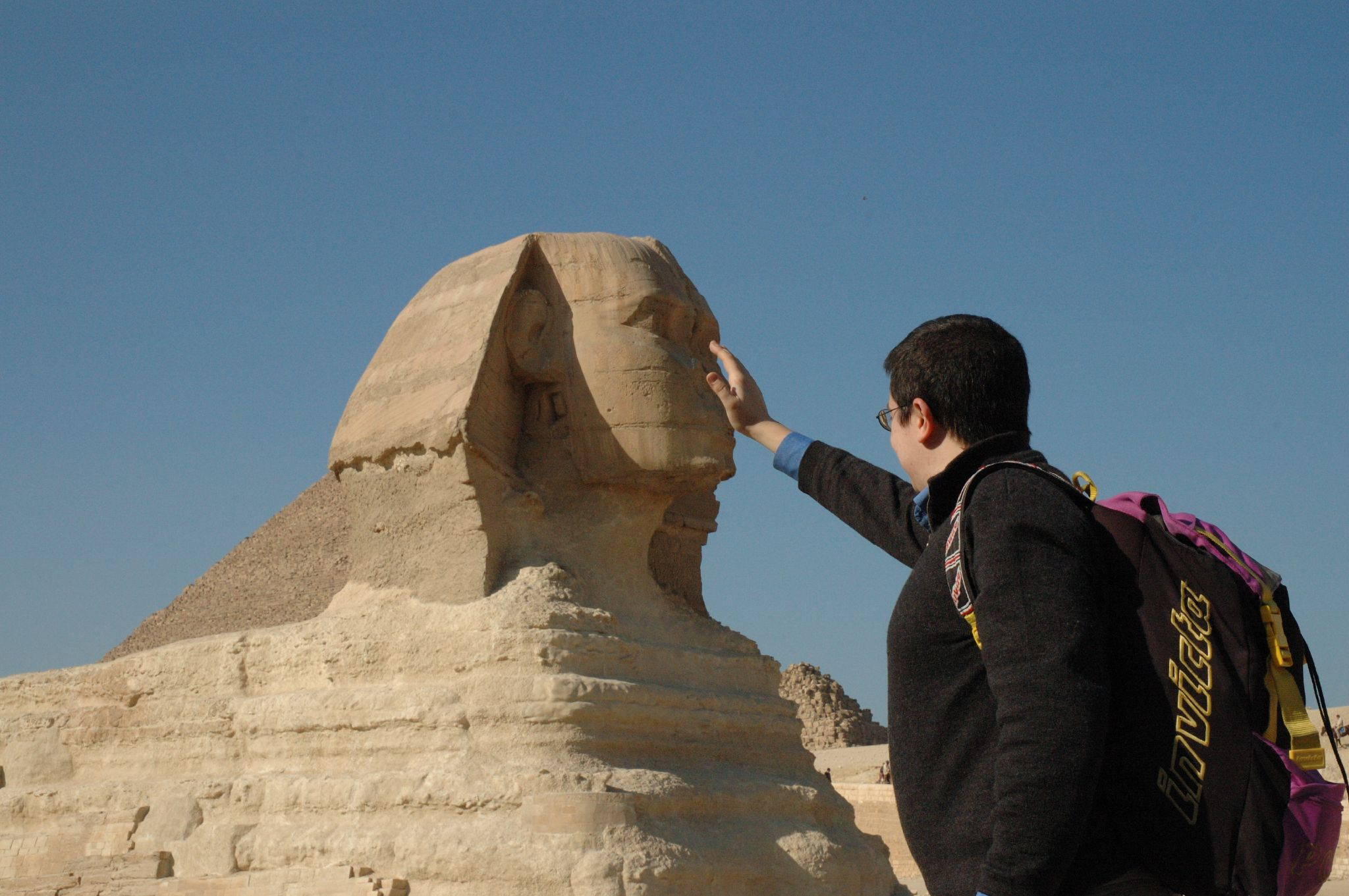
Forced perspective illusion wherein the perceived size of the Sphinx next to a human is distorted by the incomplete view of both, and the appearance of physical contact between the two

Size in general is the magnitude or dimensions of a thing. More specifically, geometrical size (or spatial size) can refer to three geometrical measures: length, area, or volume. Length can be generalized to other linear dimensions (width, height, diameter, perimeter). Size can also be measured in terms of mass, especially when assuming a density range.

This animation gives a sense of the scale of some of the known objects in our universe.

In mathematical terms, "size is a concept abstracted from the process of measuring by comparing a longer to a shorter". Size is determined by the process of comparing or measuring objects, which results in the determination of the magnitude of a quantity, such as length or mass, relative to a unit of measurement. Such a magnitude is usually expressed as a numerical value of units on a previously established spatial scale, such as meters or inches.

The sizes with which humans tend to be most familiar are body dimensions (measures of anthropometry), which include measures such as human height and human body weight. These measures can, in the aggregate, allow the generation of commercially useful distributions of products that accommodate expected body sizes, as with the creation of clothing sizes and shoe sizes, and with the standardization of door frame dimensions, ceiling heights, and bed sizes. The human experience of size can lead to a psychological tendency towards size bias, wherein the relative importance or perceived complexity of organisms and other objects is judged based on their size relative to humans, and particularly whether this size makes them easy to observe without aid.

== Human perception ==
Humans most frequently perceive the size of objects through visual cues. One common means of perceiving size is to compare the size of a newly observed object with the size of a familiar object whose size is already known. Binocular vision gives humans the capacity for depth perception, which can be used to judge which of several objects is closer, and by how much, which allows for some estimation of the size of the more distant object relative to the closer object. This also allows for the estimation of the size of large objects based on comparison of closer and farther parts of the same object. The perception of size can be distorted by manipulating these cues, for example through the creation of forced perspective.

Some measures of size may also be determined by sound. Visually impaired humans often use echolocation to determine features of their surroundings, such as the size of spaces and objects. However, even humans who lack this ability can tell if a space that they are unable to see is large or small from hearing sounds echo in the space. Size can also be determined by touch, which is a process of haptic perception.

The sizes of objects that can not readily be measured merely by sensory input may be evaluated with other kinds of measuring instruments. For example, objects too small to be seen with the naked eye may be measured when viewed through a microscope, while objects too large to fit within the field of vision may be measured using a telescope, or through extrapolation from known reference points. However, even very advanced measuring devices may still present a limited field of view.

== Terminology ==
Objects being described by their relative size are often described as being comparatively big and little, or large and small, although "big and little tend to carry affective and evaluative connotations, whereas large and small tend to refer only to the size of a thing". A wide range of other terms exist to describe things by their relative size, with small things being described for example as tiny, miniature, or minuscule, and large things being described as, for example, huge, gigantic, or enormous. Objects are also typically described as tall or short specifically relative to their vertical height, and as long or short specifically relative to their length along other directions. People who have experienced excessive growth and height significantly above average are described as having gigantism. Outside of humans, deep-sea gigantism (or abyssal gigantism) is the tendency for species of deep-sea dwelling animals to be larger than their shallower-water relatives across a large taxonomic range, and island gigantism (or insular gigantism) is a biological phenomenon in which the size of an animal species isolated on an island increases dramatically in comparison to its mainland relatives.

Although the size of an object may be reflected in its mass or its weight, each of these is a different concept. In scientific contexts, mass refers loosely to the amount of "matter" in an object (though "matter" may be difficult to define), whereas weight refers to the force experienced by an object due to gravity. An object with a mass of 1.0 kilogram will weigh approximately 9.81 newtons (newton is the unit of force, while kilogram is the unit of mass) on the surface of the Earth (its mass multiplied by the gravitational field strength). Its weight will be less on Mars (where gravity is weaker), more on Saturn, and negligible in space when far from any significant source of gravity, but it will always have the same mass. Two objects of equal size, however, may have very different mass and weight, depending on the composition and density of the objects. By contrast, if two objects are known to have roughly the same composition, then some information about the size of one can be determined by measuring the size of the other, and determining the difference in weight between the two. For example, if two blocks of wood are equally dense, and it is known that one weighs ten kilograms and the other weighs twenty kilograms, and that the ten kilogram block has a volume of one cubic foot, then it can be deduced that the twenty kilogram block has a volume of two cubic feet.

== Conceptualization and generalization ==
The concept of size is often applied to ideas that have no physical reality. In mathematics, magnitude is the size of a mathematical object, which is an abstract object with no concrete existence. Magnitude is a property by which the object can be compared as larger or smaller than other objects of the same kind. More formally, an object's magnitude is an ordering (or ranking) of the class of objects to which it belongs. There are various other mathematical concepts of size for sets, such as:

- measure (mathematics), a systematic way to assign to each suitable subset a number
- cardinality (equal if there is a bijection), of a set is a measure of the "number of elements of the set"
- for well-ordered sets: ordinal number (equal if there is an order-isomorphism)

In statistics (hypothesis testing), the "size" of the test refers to the rate of false positives, denoted by α. In astronomy, the magnitude of brightness or intensity of a star is measured on a logarithmic scale. Such a scale is also used to measure the intensity of an earthquake, and this intensity is often referred to as the "size" of the event. In computing, file size is a measure of the size of a computer file, typically measured in bytes. The actual amount of disk space consumed by the file depends on the file system. The maximum file size a file system supports depends on the number of bits reserved to store size information and the total size of the file system in terms of its capacity to store bits of information.

In physics, the Planck length, denoted ℓ_{P}, is a unit of length, equal to 1.616199(97)×10^{−35} metres. It is a unit in the system of Planck units, developed by physicist Max Planck. The Planck length is defined in terms of three fundamental physical constants: the speed of light, the Planck constant, and the Newtonian constant of gravitation. In contrast, the largest observable thing is the observable universe. The comoving distance – the distance as would be measured at a specific time, including the present – between Earth and the edge of the observable universe is 46 billion light-years (14×10^{9} pc), making the diameter of the observable universe about 91 billion light-years (28×10^{9} pc).

In poetry, fiction, and other literature, size is occasionally assigned to characteristics that do not have measurable dimensions, such as the metaphorical reference to the size of a person's heart as a shorthand for describing their typical degree of kindness or generosity. A famous example is associated with the fictional character, the Grinch, who was said in the story to have been born with a heart that they say was "two sizes too small", such that when he is later redeemed, his heart grows "three sizes that day", leading cardiologist David Kass to humorously suggest that the rapid growth of the Grinch's heart at the end of the story indicates that the Grinch has the physiology of a Burmese python. With respect to physical size, the concept of resizing is occasionally presented in fairy tales, fantasy, and science fiction, placing humans in a different context within their natural environment by depicting them as having physically been made exceptionally large or exceptionally small through some fantastic means.

== See also ==
- Amount of substance
- Dimensional instruments
- Orders of magnitude (length)
- Particle number
