= Data merge =

Data merge may refer to:

- Mail merge
- Data integration
- Merge algorithm

== See also ==
- Merge (disambiguation)
