= WinMerge =

Open-source data software

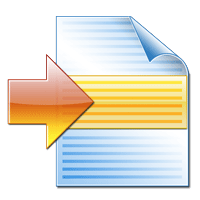
- Developer: WinMerge Development Team
- Initial release: November 20, 2000; 25 years ago
- Stable release: 2.16.50 (July 27, 2025; 5 months ago) [±]
- Repository: github.com/WinMerge/winmerge
- Written in: C++
- Operating system: Microsoft Windows
- Available in: Multilingual
- Type: Data comparison
- License: GPL
- Website: winmerge.org

WinMerge is a free software tool for data comparison and merging of text-like files. It is useful for determining what has changed between versions, and then merging changes between versions.

WinMerge runs on Microsoft Windows.

== Features ==
- Visual differencing and merging of text files
- Flexible editor with syntax highlighting, line numbers, and word-wrap
- Handles DOS, Unix, and Mac text file formats
- Unicode support (as of version 2.8.0, UTF-8 files are correctly read without a BOM)
- Difference pane shows current difference in two vertical panes
- Location pane shows map of files compared
- Highlights differences inside lines in file compare
- Can also generate HTML report with differences highlighted
- Regular expression-based file filters in directory compare allow excluding and including items
- Moved lines detection in file compare
- Ability to ignore whitespace and letter case changes
- Creates patch files
- Shell integration (supports 64-bit Windows versions)
- Rudimentary Visual SourceSafe and IBM DevOps Code ClearCase integration
- Archive file support using 7-Zip
- Plug-ins
- Language localization via plain-text PO files
- Online manual and installed HTML help manual
- Generates normal, context, and unified patches.

== Codebases and forks ==
WinMerge 2011 (discontinued)
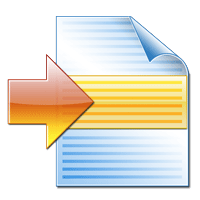
- Developer: jtuc
- Initial release: December 3, 2011; 14 years ago
- Preview release: 2011.009.217 / May 26, 2019; 6 years ago
- Repository: bitbucket.org/jtuc/winmerge2011
- Written in: C++
- Operating system: Microsoft Windows
- Available in: Multilingual
- Type: Data comparison
- License: GPL
- Website: bitbucket.org/jtuc/winmerge2011

WinMerge 2011
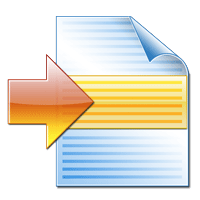
- Developer: datadiode
- Initial release: December 3, 2011; 14 years ago
- Preview release: 0.2011.211.170 / June 5, 2021; 4 years ago
- Repository: github.com/datadiode/winmerge2011
- Written in: C++
- Operating system: Microsoft Windows
- Available in: Multilingual
- Type: Data comparison
- License: GPL
- Website: github.com/datadiode/winmerge2011

For a planned development of version 3.x no commits have been made to the 3.0 codebase since 2011.

In 2011 a fork of the 2.x codebase titled "WinMerge 2011" was created. This new branch has continued to see active feature and bug fix development. It has also removed ATL/MFC dependencies so that WinMerge can be built using the free Visual C++ Express editions.

== See also ==
- Comparison of file comparison tools
