= WinDiff =

File comparison program by Microsoft

- Developer: Microsoft
- Initial release: 1992; 33 years ago
- Stable release: 6.1.7716.0 / May 14, 2010; 15 years ago
- Operating system: Microsoft Windows
- Type: File comparison tool
- License: Proprietary commercial software

WinDiff is a graphical file comparison program published by Microsoft, distributed with Microsoft Windows Support Tools, certain versions of Microsoft Visual Studio, and as source-code with the Platform SDK code samples. WinDiff was included in the Windows SDK (previously known as the Resource Kit, later Platform SDK) since 1992 until Microsoft Windows SDK for Windows 7 and .NET Framework 4 (a.k.a. Windows SDK 7.1). Because portions of the Windows SDK were shipped in Visual Studio, WinDiff was also included in Visual Studio until Visual Studio 2010. WinDiff was removed from the Windows 8 SDK and therefore is not included in Visual Studio 2012 or any later version. A number of unofficial standalone uploads of the program remain available.

== Versions ==
Signing date	File version	SHA-256 of the 64-bit executable file	Source
2008-01-16	6.0.6001.17131	a7687e7be3c515337bddb5cf92b7e04830389be5dc589e0b78cdda1e9bc91ac1	Windows SDK for Windows Server 2008 and .NET Framework 3.5 (link is broken, download not available)
March 19, 2010 1:58:13 PM	6.1.7600.16385	7c0681fd0b0fb2ea0a058c1f5be78cc1aad18fcd40c65905d07ec492d9a3f916	Visual Studio 2010 SP1
2010-05-14	6.1.7716.0	deded18de43c248df3a80713bf010030285aea6a38a39e0ce5edfe3e9ed788b3	Microsoft Windows SDK for Windows 7 and .NET Framework 4

== See also ==
- Comparison of file comparison tools
- Windows Support Tools
