= Destructibility of contingent remainders =

A common law rule "that a freehold contingent remainder which does not vest at or before the termination of the preceding freehold estate is destroyed. Such termination of the preceding estate might result from the natural expiration of that estate, or from forfeiture, or from merger."
