= Merger doctrine (trust law) =

In trust law the term "doctrine of merger" refers to the fusing of legal and equitable title in the event the same person becomes both the sole trustee and the sole beneficiary of a trust. In such a case, the trust is sometimes deemed to have terminated (with the result that the beneficiary owns the trust property outright).

== See also ==
- Merger doctrine (civil procedure)
- Merger doctrine (family law)
- Merger doctrine (property law)
