= Merger doctrine (civil procedure) =

The merger doctrine in civil procedure stands for the proposition that when litigants agree to a settlement, and then seek to have their settlement incorporated into a court order, the court order actually extinguishes the settlement and replaces it with the authority of the court to supervise the behavior of the parties. Under this doctrine, the court is free to modify its order as necessary to achieve justice in the case, and may hold a party that breaches the agreement in contempt of court.

In U.S criminal law, merger doctrine holds that if a defendant has committed acts that simultaneously meet the elements of a more serious and less serious offense, the defendant may be charged with the more serious offense and the lesser offense drops in order to avoid implicating double jeopardy.

== See also ==
- Merger doctrine (family law)
- Merger doctrine (property law)
- Merger doctrine (trust law)
