= Windows Support Tools =

Windows XP Support Tools
- Developer(s): Microsoft
- Initial release: August 24, 2001
- Stable release: SP2 / August 10, 2004; 20 years ago
- Size: 10.3 MB

Windows 2000 Support Tools
- Developer(s): Microsoft
- Initial release: February 17, 2000
- Stable release: SP4 / June 26, 2003; 21 years ago
- Size: 4.7 MB

Windows Server 2003 Support Tools
- Developer(s): Microsoft
- Initial release: April 24, 2003
- Stable release: SP2 / March 12, 2007; 18 years ago
- Size: 3.7 MB

Windows Support Tools is a suite of management, administration and troubleshooting tools for Windows 2000, Windows XP, Windows Server 2003 and Windows Server 2003 R2 from Microsoft.

== Overview ==
These tools are not installed with the Windows operating system and have to be separately installed. They are located on the Windows Installation CD, Support folder, Tools subfolder. They can also be downloaded from Microsoft Download Center.

Windows Server 2003 Support Tools includes 70 different tools. For instance, WinDiff is a GUI tool for comparing files and folders. NetDiag is a CLI tool for diagnosing network problems. This tool is command-line version of the Network Troubleshooter that can be found in Windows Help and Support Center. Windows Installer Zapper (msizap.exe, a command-line tool) and Windows Installer CleanUp Utility (Msicuu.exe, a GUI tool) are tools for cleaning Windows Installer databases in Microsoft Windows. Many of the Windows Resource Kit tools are included as part of the Support Tools. Although no x64 Resource Kit tools have been produced by Microsoft, some support tools are available in native x64 versions on the Windows XP Professional x64 and Windows Server 2003 x64 Editions CDs.

== See also ==
- Help and Support Center
- Ntdetect.com
