= Merger doctrine (family law) =

Family law notion

Historically, the merger doctrine (a.k.a. "doctrine of merger") was the notion that marriage caused a woman's legal identity to merge with that of her husband. Thus, a woman could not sue or testify against her husband any more than he could sue or testify against himself. Since her identity had merged with his, the two were now considered one legal entity.

== See also ==
- Merger doctrine (civil procedure)
- Merger doctrine (property law)
- Merger doctrine (trust law)
- Coverture
