= Cervisia =

Graphical frontend for CVS file system

- Developers: Bernd Gehrmann, Christian Loose, André Wöbbeking, Carlos Woelz
- Stable release: 25.04.3 / 3 July 2025; 10 months ago
- Preview release: 21.07.90 / 30 July 2021; 4 years ago
- Written in: C++
- Type: Version control
- License: GNU General Public License Version 2
- Website: apps.kde.org/cervisia/
- Repository: invent.kde.org/sdk/cervisia

Cervisia is a graphical front end for Concurrent Versions System (CVS).

Cervisia implements the common CVS functions of adding, removing, and committing files. More advanced capabilities include importing and checking-out modules, adding/removing watches, editing/unediting and locking/unlocking files, blame-annotated file viewing, tagging/branching, conflict resolution/mergings and the ability to update to a given tag or branch. Additionally, it has graphical functions that include tree and list views of the change log of a file, color-coded file status, and graphical diff'ing between versions, similar to xdiff.

Cervisia started to be updated to Qt 5 and KDE Frameworks 5 in November 2015. The porting ended in June 2016.
