= Resource Kit =

Set of software resources by Microsoft

Resource Kit is a term used by Microsoft for a set of software resources and documentation released for their software products, but which is not part of that product. Resource kits offer supplementary resources such as technical guidance, compatibility and troubleshooting information, management, support, maintenance and deployment guides and multipurpose useful administrative utilities, which are available separately.

== Overview ==
The most common form of the Resource Kits are as a large book or box set of books which come with CD-ROM(s), both of which have been supplemented in some cases such as the Resource Kits for Windows NT Server versions 3.51 and 4.0 and Windows 2000 Server.

The text of the Resource Kit books are also available with versions of the Microsoft Developer Network (MSDN) CD-ROMs, and a large subset to complete set of the tools included in the kits can be downloaded from the Microsoft web site. The tools can include everything from extra commands for the command line to general interest programmes like 3D Paint to network-related tools to performance monitoring tools to interpreters for programming languages like Perl, Rexx, and others to interoperability tools like Windows versions of some Unix commands and shells.

The Resource Kits, especially in the case of the Windows NT-2000 stream of operating systems, also include third-party software like various versions of Crystal Reports and PowerDesk.

Typically, Microsoft releases resource kits after every major version of Microsoft Windows, Microsoft Office or another major product. Resource kits have also been released for Internet Explorer, BackOffice and other software.

Those seeking Windows-Unix interoperability in various forms can also use an unrelated software product, Windows Services For Unix, which contains such items as the Interix C and Korn shells, ActiveState's ActivePerl and many other Posix-compliant tools and additions to the operating system. This package is sometimes confused with being a Resource Kit for Unix. The Microsoft Office resource kits are also relevant to the versions of these office suites for the MacIntosh.

The Resource Kit tools mainly help administrators streamline management tasks such as troubleshooting operating system issues, configuring networking and security features, managing Active Directory and automating application deployment. The resource kits are also geared towards "power users" and contain other tools such as extra commands for the Windows batch/shell environment, programming aids, database tools, and miscellaneous tools. Interpreters for programming languages such as Perl, Rexx, KiXtart, awk and a version of the Unix Korn shell are available with many of the operating system Resource Kits, including those for both the Windows 95-98 and Windows NT-2000 streams of operating systems.

== Windows Resource Kits ==
Windows Resource Kit was introduced with Windows 3.0 in 1991 and has since been released for every Windows version up to Windows 7, except for Windows Me, Windows CE and Windows 98 Second Edition. A Resource kit for MS-DOS 6.22 was released in 1992. Resource Kits were also not produced for Microsoft's two non-Windows operating systems, OS/2 (prior to version 3.0) and Xenix mainly because they were not actively promoted after 1991. With the Windows NT-2000 stream of operating systems, separate kits are released for the Workstation (or Professional) and Server versions thereof; the latter's documentation is a box set of four to a dozen or so books in each case whereas a single large book comes with the former as well as for the Windows 3.11 and Windows 95 to Windows 98 Resource Kits.

=== Windows 9x family ===
The Windows 95 to Windows 98 Resource Kit documentations and tools were available free of charge and a Resource Kit Sampler was included on the respective Windows installation CD-ROM discs. Resource Kit tools can generally be downloaded from the Microsoft Download Center free of charge, while the technical guidance and information is released in the form of Microsoft Press books. The CD-ROM discs accompanying the books, contain electronic versions of the books and include the Resource Kit tools and utilities, some of which may be exclusive.

=== Windows NT family ===
The Windows NT 4.0 Resource Kits (Workstation and Server) contained a particularly large number of tools and utilities as well as third-party software. The tools included in these kits for command-line use are considered by many Windows NT shell programmers to be essential to getting the full use of the facility.

In the past, Microsoft used to release supplements for some Resource Kits which offered revised and new tools and resources. Microsoft released two supplements for the Windows NT 3.51 Server Resource Kit, four supplements for the Windows NT 4.0 Server Resource Kit and one supplement for the Windows 2000 Server Resource Kit. Some of these utilities (such as robocopy and takeown) later shipped as part of Windows XP and Windows Vista. Others were included in later Resource Kits. Older Resource Kits are no longer available from Microsoft but can in most cases be ordered from booksellers.

The Windows 2000 Resource Kit also contains over 300 utilities. For Windows XP and Windows Server 2003, over 120 tools and utilities have been updated. The Windows disc for Windows 2000, Windows XP and later operating systems also includes a set of tools known as Windows Support Tools. Many of the support tools are also included in the Resource Kit, some being updated versions of past Resource Kit tools. The Microsoft web site has downloads of Windows 2000/XP era tools which are in addition to those in the standard kits or updated version of the ones shipping in the Resource Kits. Windows XP Professional Resource Kit, Third Edition was released after Windows XP Service Pack 2. All of the Windows Server 2003 Resource Kit Tools are available for download free of charge.

There have been no native 64-bit resource kit tools produced and existing 32-bit resource kit tools are not supported on x64 platforms. The text of all Resource Kit books is included in the MSDN Library CD/DVD-ROM sets. Full implementations of MSDN contain all of the Resource Kits in text or HTML format as well as some of the others, full documentation for Microsoft Office, Internet Explorer, and Back Office as well as all of the operating systems covered.

In 2007, Microsoft released the Windows Vista Resource Kit. In 2008, Windows Server 2008 Resource Kits was released and Windows Vista Resource Kit, Second Edition was updated for Service Pack 1. The Windows Vista Resource Kit ships with several sample VBScripts and few PowerShell scripts. Microsoft has also released Resource Kits for Group Policy, Windows security, Active Directory, Terminal Services and Internet Information Services 7.

Windows 7 Resource Kit was released on September 14, 2009. Microsoft has announced that new unsupported Resource Kit tools will not be provided for current and future operating systems.

== Other resource kits ==
The Office Resource Kit and tools are included on the respective Office CD/DVD and/or separately. The tools are also available for download from Microsoft web site.

Microsoft has also released Resource Kits for Internet Explorer, Windows Media, Internet Information Services, Back Office and several server products such as SharePoint and Microsoft Exchange Server.

The PowerShell team has released a Resource Kit PowerShell Pack, a collection of PowerShell modules that adds over 700 scripts to those already present in Windows 7.

== See also ==
- Microsoft PowerToys
