= File Compare =

Command-line program that compares multiple files

fc
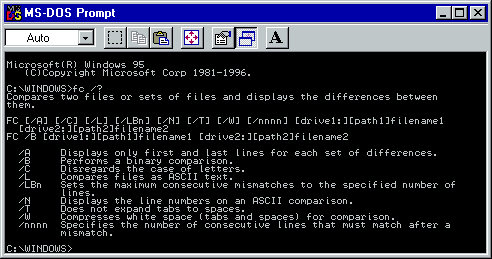
- The Windows 95 fc command
- Original author: Mani A. Ulloa
- Developers: Microsoft, IBM, Digital Research, Novell
- Release: 1984, 41–42 years ago
- Written in: MS-DOS: x86 assembly language FreeDOS: C
- Operating system: MS-DOS, PC DOS, OS/2, eComStation, ArcaOS, Windows
- Platform: Cross-platform
- Type: Command
- License: MS-DOS: MIT; FreeDOS: GPLv2+
- Website: docs.microsoft.com/en-us/windows-server/administration/windows-commands/fc
- Repository: github.com/microsoft/MS-DOS/blob/main/v2.0/source/FC.ASM

In computing, fc (File Compare) is a command-line program in MS-DOS and compatible systems, OS/2, and Windows, that compares multiple files and outputs the differences between them. It is similar to the Unix commands comm, cmp and diff.

== History ==
The fc command has been included in Microsoft operating systems since MS-DOS 2.11 (e.g. on the 1984/85 DEC Rainbow release) and is included in all versions of Microsoft Windows. fc has also been included in IBM OS/2 Version 2.0.

DR DOS 6.0 includes an implementation of the fc command.

The command is also available in FreeDOS. This implementation is licensed under the GPLv2+.

== Functionality ==
fc can compare text files as well as binary files. The latest versions can compare ASCII or Unicode text. The result of comparisons are output to the standard output. The output of fc is intended primarily to be human readable and may be difficult to use in other programs.

== See also ==
- Data comparison
- comp (command)
- List of DOS commands
