= ME Research UK =

UK medical research charity

- Formation: 2000; 26 years ago
- Founder: Dr Vance Spence; Robert McRae
- Purpose: To fund research projects regarding myalgic encephalomyelitis (ME)
- Headquarters: Perth, Scotland
- Website: meresearch.org.uk

ME Research UK is a medical research charity based in the United Kingdom with the principal aim of commissioning and funding scientific (biomedical) investigation into the causes, consequences and treatment of myalgic encephalomyelitis/chronic fatigue syndrome (ME/CFS). ME/CFS is a debilitating illness which affects between 120,000 and 240,000 people in the United Kingdom alone, but which is not well understood nor, in many cases, properly recognised.

== History ==
The organisation (charity number SC036942) was formed in 2000 under the name Myalgic Encephalomyelitis Research Group for Education and Support (MERGE), with an official opening in May 2001. Its headquarters are in Perth, Scotland.

Ongoing research projects currently funded by ME Research UK include a Swedish study to provide an independent investigation into the link between xenotropic murine leukemia virus–related virus (XMRV) and ME/CFS, an investigation into autonomic dysfunction (dysautonomia) in ME/CFS, research to identify key single-nucleotide polymorphisms associated with ME/CFS, and a study of the relationship between vitamin D status and cardiovascular function in ME/CFS.

In addition to funding research into biomedical aspects of ME/CFS, the charity produces reviews and reports, organises and presents research at professional meetings and conferences, and was instrumental in forming a cross party group on the condition at the Scottish Parliament.

Most of its funds come from private and corporate donations, and the Friends of ME Research UK Friends scheme has been set up to support the charity and help with fundraising.

== See also ==
- ME Association
- Action for ME
