= JEdit =

Cross platform text editor

jEdit
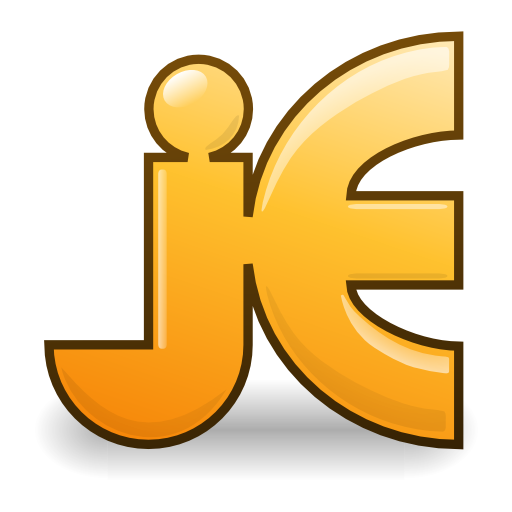

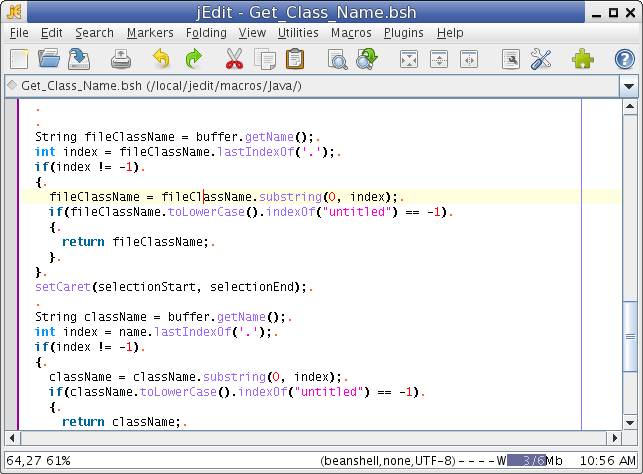
- jEdit 4.3 showing Java macro.
- Original author: Slava Pestov
- Developer: jEdit project
- Release: 1998; 28 years ago
- Stable release: 5.7.0 / 3 August 2024
- Written in: Java
- Operating system: Java-supporting
- Available in: English
- Type: Text editor
- License: GPL-2.0-or-later
- Website: jedit.org
- Repository: sourceforge.net/p/jedit/svn/HEAD/tree/

jEdit is a free and open-source text editor available under GPL-2.0-or-later. It is written in Java and runs on any operating system with Java support, including BSD, Linux, macOS and Windows.

== History ==
The development of jEdit was started by Slava Pestov in 1998, who left the project in 2006, handing development to the free software community.

== Features ==
jEdit includes syntax highlighting that provides native support for over 200 file formats. Support for additional formats can be added manually using XML files. It supports UTF-8 and many other encodings.

It has extensive code folding and text folding capabilities as well as text wrapping that takes indents into account.

The application is highly customizable and can be extended with macros written in BeanShell, Jython, ECMAScript and some other scripting languages.

=== Plug-ins ===
There are over 150 available jEdit plug-ins for many different application areas.

Plug-ins are used to customize the application for individual use and can make it into an advanced XML/HTML editor, or an integrated development environment (IDE), with compiler, code completion, context-sensitive help, debugging, visual differentiation and language-specific tools.

The plug-ins are downloaded via an integrated plug-in manager which finds and installs them along with any dependencies. The plugin manager will track new versions and can download associated updates automatically.

Some available plug-ins include:

- Spell checker using Aspell
- Syntax and style checkers for various languages
- Text auto-complete
- Accents plugin that converts character abbreviations for accented characters as they are typed.
- XML plugin that is used for editing XML, HTML, ECMAScript and CSS files. In the case of XML, the plug-in does validation. For XML, HTML and CSS, it uses auto-completion popups for elements, attributes and entities.

== Reception ==
In general, jEdit has received positive reviews from developers.

Rob Griffiths wrote in April 2002 for MAC OS X HINTS saying he was "very impressed" and naming it "pick of the week". He cited its file memory upon reopening, its ability to notice if an open file was changed on disk by another program, syntax coloring, including that users can create their own color schemes, split windows feature, show line number feature, convertible tabs to soft-tabs and view sidebars. He also praised its customization possibilities using the extensive preferences panel and the "on the fly" search engine, which searches while typing. Griffiths noted that the application has a few drawbacks, such as that it is "a bit slow at scrolling a line at a time" and that because it is a Java application it doesn't have the full Aqua interface.

Also reviewing the application in April 2002, Daniel Steinberg writing for O'Reilly Media said:

The strength of jEdit for Java developers comes from the plug-ins contributed by the community...For the most part, there's nothing here that couldn't be done with BBEdit or even with Emacs or vi. jEdit packages the capabilities much more nicely and makes it easy to call often-used functionality using the plug-ins. Where I saw NetBeans as overkill, others may see jEdit as underkill for an IDE or overkill for a text editor. I find it Mac friendly and easy to use. I don't expect too much from it, so I tend to be pleased with what I get.

Scott Beatty reviewing jEdit on SitePoint in 2005 particularly noted the application's folding feature along with its search and replace and PHP syntax highlighting capabilities. He recommended the use of the PHPParser plug-in. PHPParser is a sidebar that checks for PHP syntax errors whenever a PHP code file is loaded or saved. He noted that downloading jEdit is simple, but that getting and installing the plug-ins to customize it for individual use can be a complex process: "Beware that a full setup requires a series of downloads, and that this process can take time."

Writing in December 2011, reviewer Rares Aioanei praised jEdit's versatility, stating "jEdit's design allows you to use it as a simple editor, but also use it as an IDE and expand its functionality via plugins so that it becomes exactly what you want it to be for the task or language at hand." but also adding that "jEdit is not, however, an IDE with everything but the Christmas tree, like Eclipse or Microsoft Visual Studio. Rather, it's a compact application for editing code, providing practical tools along with basic IDE features."

== See also ==
- List of text editors
- Comparison of text editors
