= Beyond Compare =

Data comparison software

- Developer: Scooter Software
- Stable release: 5.2.0 / 23 February 2026; 29 days ago
- Operating system: Windows, Mac, Linux
- Platform: Cross-platform
- Size: 27 MB
- Type: Data comparison
- License: Proprietary
- Website: www.scootersoftware.com

Beyond Compare is a cross-platform proprietary data comparison utility. The program is able to compare files and multiple types of directories, as well as archives. Beyond Compare can be configured as a difftool and mergetool of version control systems, such as git.

== Reception ==
In an April 2009 review, Beyond Compare received four out of five rating stars from CNET. The reviewers initially found the user interface to be "a little overwhelming", but they "quickly got the hang of it" after using the program for a while. PC World writer Michael Desmond included the program in a 2005 list of utilities for a "Trouble-Free PC" and praised its "watch list" feature. Beyond Compare also was featured in the March 2005 issue of the Windows IT Pro magazine in the "What's Hot" section.

Scott Mitchell, writing for MSDN Magazine, identified the program's comparison rules as its most powerful feature. The customizable rules control which differences between two files should be flagged as such. A set of predefined rules is included for the comparison of common file types, such as C++ source code, XML, and HTML files.

Steve Gibson of GRC described it as "a really cool ... very smart Windows-based source comparison tool".

== See also ==
- Comparison of file comparison tools
