= Cmp (Unix) =

File comparison command

cmp
- Original authors: Dennis Ritchie (AT&T Bell Laboratories)
- Developers: Various open-source and commercial developers
- Initial release: November 3, 1971; 54 years ago
- Written in: Plan 9: C
- Operating system: Unix, Unix-like, Plan 9, Inferno, OS-9, IBM i
- Type: Command
- License: coreutils: GPLv3+ Plan 9: MIT License

cmp is a shell command that compares two files of any type and reports differences. By default, it outputs nothing if the files match. If they differ, it reports the byte and line number of the first difference. The exit code can be used programmatically since it is 0 if the files match, 1 if the files differ or 2 if comparison fails (i.e. inaccessible or missing argument).

The command is available on Unix-like systems, OS-9, IBM i and Windows (via UnxUtils). The command first appeared in Version 1 Unix. It is part of the X/Open Portability Guide since issue 2 of 1987. It was inherited into the first version of POSIX.1 and the Single Unix Specification. The implementation in GNU coreutils was written by Torbjorn Granlund and David MacKenzie.

== Use ==
Command line options include:

Option	Description	Unix	Plan 9	Inferno	FreeBSD	Linux	IBM i
-b, --print-bytes	Print the differing bytes; display control bytes as a '^' followed by a letter of the alphabet and precede bytes that have the high bit set with 'M-' (which stands for "meta")	No	No	No	No	Yes	No
-h	Do not follow symbolic links	No	No	No	Yes	No	No
-i SKIP, --ignore-initial=SKIP	Skip the first SKIP bytes of input	No	No	No	No	Yes	No
-i SKIP1:SKIP2, --ignore- initial= SKIP1:SKIP2	Skip the first SKIP1 bytes of FILE1 and the first SKIP2 bytes of FILE2	No	No	No	No	Yes	No
-l, --verbose	Print the (decimal) byte numbers and (octal) values of all differing bytes, instead of the default info; also, print the EOF message if one file is shorter than the other	Yes	Yes	Yes	Yes	Yes	Yes
-L	Print the line number of the first differing byte	Yes	Yes	Yes	No	No	No
-n LIMIT, --bytes=LIMIT	Compare at most LIMIT bytes	No	No	No	No	Yes	No
-s, --quiet, --silent	Print nothing; yield exit status only	Yes	Yes	Yes	Yes	Yes	Yes
-t	Text mode where the files are opened in text mode and translated to the CCSID of the job before comparing byte for byte	No	No	No	No	No	Yes
-v, --version	Print version info	No	No	No	No	Yes	No
-x	Like -l but prints in hexadecimal and using zero as index for the first byte in the files	No	No	No	Yes	No	No
-z	For regular files, compare file sizes first, and fail if they are not equal	No	No	No	Yes	No	No
--help	Print command-line help info	No	No	No	No	Yes	No

Operands that are byte counts are decimal by default, but may be preceded by '0' for octal and '0x' for hexadecimal.

A byte count can be followed by a suffix to specify a multiple of that count; in this case an omitted integer is understood to be 1. A bare size letter, or one followed by 'iB', specifies a multiple using powers of 1024. A size letter followed by 'B' specifies powers of 1000 instead. For example, '-n 4M' and '-n 4MiB' are equivalent to '-n 4194304', whereas '-n 4MB' is equivalent to '-n 4000000'. This notation is upward compatible with the SI prefixes for decimal multiples and with the IEC 60027-2 prefixes for binary multiples.

== Example ==
Example use to report different bytes between text files

== See also ==
- Comparison of file comparison tools
- List of POSIX commands
