= Diff =

Shell command for comparing file content

diff
- Original authors: Douglas McIlroy (AT&T Bell Laboratories)
- Developers: Various open-source and commercial developers
- Release: June 1974; 52 years ago
- Written in: C
- Operating system: Unix, Unix-like, V, Plan 9, Inferno
- Platform: Cross-platform
- Type: Command
- License: Plan 9: MIT License

diff is a shell command that compares the content of files and reports differences. The term diff is also used to identify the output of the command and is used as a verb for running the command. To diff files, one runs diff to create a diff.

Typically, the command is used to compare text files, but it does support comparing binary files. If one of the input files contains non-textual data, the command defaults to brief-mode, reporting only a summary indication of whether the files differ. With the --text option, it always reports line-based differences; however, the output may be difficult to understand, as binary data is generally not structured in lines like text.

Although the command is primarily used ad hoc to analyze changes between two files, a special use is for creating a patch file for use with the patch command – which was specifically designed to use a diff output report as a patch file. POSIX standardized the diff and patch commands including their shared file format.

== History ==
The original diff utility was developed in the early 1970s for the Unix operating system, at Bell Labs in Murray Hill, New Jersey. It was part of the 5th Edition of Unix released in 1974, and was written by Douglas McIlroy, and James Hunt. This research was published in a 1976 paper co-written with James W. Hunt, who developed an initial prototype of diff. The algorithm this paper described became known as the Hunt–Szymanski algorithm.

McIlroy's work was preceded and influenced by Steve Johnson's comparison program on GECOS and Mike Lesk's proof program. Proof also originated on Unix and, like diff, produced line-by-line changes and even used angle-brackets (">" and "<") to indicate line insertions and deletions in the program's output. The heuristics used in these early applications were, however, deemed unreliable. The potential usefulness of a diff tool led McIlroy to research and design a more robust tool for a variety of tasks that could perform well under the processing and size limitations of the PDP-11's hardware. His approach to the problem resulted from collaboration with individuals at Bell Labs, including Alfred Aho, Elliot Pinson, Jeffrey Ullman, and Harold S. Stone.

In the context of Unix, the use of the ed line editor provided diff with the natural ability to create machine-usable "edit scripts". These edit scripts, when saved to a file, can, along with the original file, be reconstituted by ed into the modified file in its entirety. This greatly reduced the secondary storage necessary to maintain multiple versions of a file. McIlroy considered writing a post-processor for diff where a variety of output formats could be designed and implemented; however, he found it more frugal and simpler to have diff be responsible for generating the syntax and reverse-order input accepted by the ed command.

In 1984, Larry Wall created the patch utility (releasing its source code on the mod.sources and net.sources newsgroups) for patching text files, using the output from diff plus the diff input file with the content before changes to create a file with the content after changes.

X/Open Portability Guide issue 2 of 1987 includes diff. Context mode was added in POSIX.1-2001 (issue 6). Unified mode was added in POSIX.1-2008 (issue 7).

In diff's early years, common uses included comparing changes in software source code and markup for technical documents, verifying program debugging output, comparing filesystem listings, and analyzing computer assembly code. The output targeted for ed was motivated to provide compression for a sequence of modifications made to a file. The Source Code Control System (SCCS) and its ability to archive revisions emerged in the late 1970s as a consequence of storing edit scripts from diff.

== Algorithm ==
Unlike edit distance notions used for other purposes, diff is line-oriented rather than character-oriented, but it is like Levenshtein distance in that it tries to determine the smallest set of deletions and insertions to create one file from the other.

The operation of diff is based on solving the longest common subsequence problem. In this problem, given two sequences of items:

a b c d f g h j q z

a b c d e f g i j k r x y z

and we want to find the longest sequence of items that is present in both original sequences in the same order. That is, we want to find a new sequence that can be obtained from the first original sequence by deleting some items and from the second original sequence by deleting other items. We also want this sequence to be as long as possible. In this case, it is

a b c d  f  g  j  z

From a longest common subsequence, it is only a small step to get diff-like output: if an item is absent in the subsequence but present in the first original sequence, it must have been deleted (as indicated by the '-' marks, below). If it is absent in the subsequence but present in the second original sequence, it must have been inserted (as indicated by the '+' marks).

e   h i   q   k r x y
+   - +   -   + + + +

== Use ==
The diff command accepts two arguments like: diff original new. Commonly, the arguments each identify normal files; however, if the two arguments identify directories, then the command compares corresponding files in the directories. With the -r option, it recursively descends matching subdirectories to compare files with corresponding relative paths.

=== Default output format ===
The example below shows the original and new file content as well as the resulting diff output in the default format. The output is shown with coloring to improve readability. GNU diff can colorize output when the --color option is used; when no --color option is specified, color output is disabled by default.

original:

This part of the
document has stayed the
same from version to
version. It shouldn't
be shown if it doesn't
change. Otherwise, that
would not be helping to
compress the size of the
changes.

This paragraph contains
text that is outdated.
It will be deleted in the
near future.

It is important to spell
check this dokument. On
the other hand, a
misspelled word isn't
the end of the world.
Nothing in the rest of
this paragraph needs to
be changed. Things can
be added after it.

new:

This is an important
notice! It should
therefore be located at
the beginning of this
document!

This part of the
document has stayed the
same from version to
version. It shouldn't
be shown if it doesn't
change. Otherwise, that
would not be helping to
compress the size of the
changes.

It is important to spell
check this document. On
the other hand, a
misspelled word isn't
the end of the world.
Nothing in the rest of
this paragraph needs to
be changed. Things can
be added after it.

This paragraph contains
important new additions
to this document.

output:

0a1,6
> This is an important
> notice! It should
> therefore be located at
> the beginning of this
> document!
>
11,15d16
< This paragraph contains
< text that is outdated.
< It will be deleted in the
< near future.
<
17c18
< check this dokument. On
---
> check this document. On
24a26,29
>
> This paragraph contains
> important new additions
> to this document.

In this default format, a indicates added, d indicates deleted, and c indicates changed. The line number of the original file appears before the single-letter code, and the line number of the new file appears after. The less-than and greater-than signs (at the beginning of lines that are added, deleted, or changed) indicate which file the lines appear in. Addition lines are added to the original file and appear in the new file. Deletion lines are deleted from the original file and are missing in the new file.

By default, lines common to both files are not shown. Lines that have moved are shown as added at their new location and as deleted from their old location. However, some diff tools highlight moved lines.

=== Edit script ===
An ed script can be generated by modern versions of diff with the -e option. The resulting edit script for this example is as follows:

24a

This paragraph contains
important new additions
to this document.
.
17c
check this document. On
.
11,15d
0a
This is an important
notice! It should
therefore be located at
the beginning of this
document!

.

To transform the content of the original file into the content of new file using ed, one appends two lines to this diff file, one line containing a w (write) command, and one containing a q (quit) command (e.g. by printf "w\nq\n" >> mydiff). Here we give the diff file the name mydiff and the transformation will happen when we run ed -s original < mydiff.

=== Context format ===
The Berkeley distribution of Unix made a point of adding the context format (-c) and the ability to recurse on filesystem directory structures (-r), adding those features in 2.8 BSD, released in July 1981. The context format of diff introduced at Berkeley helped distribute patches for source code that may have been changed minimally.

In the context format, any changed lines are shown alongside unchanged lines before and after. The inclusion of any number of unchanged lines provides context for the patch. The context consists of lines that have not changed between the two files and is a reference to locate the lines' in the modified file and find the intended location for a change to be applied, regardless of whether the line numbers still correspond. The context format improves readability for humans and reliability when applying the patch, and an output that is accepted as input to the patch program. This intelligent behavior is not possible with the traditional diff output.

The number of unchanged lines shown above and below a change hunk can be defined by the user, even zero, but three lines is typically the default. If the context of unchanged lines in a hunk overlaps with an adjacent hunk, then diff will avoid duplicating the unchanged lines and merge the hunks into a single hunk.

A "!" represents a change between lines that correspond in the two files, whereas a "+" represents the addition of a line, and a "-" the removal of a line. A blank space represents an unchanged line. At the beginning of the patch is the file information, including the full path and a time stamp delimited by a tab character. At the beginning of each hunk are the line numbers that apply to the corresponding change in the files. A number range appearing between sets of three asterisks applies to the original file; sets of three dashes apply to the new file. The hunk ranges specify the starting and ending line numbers in the respective file.

The command diff -c original new produces the following output:

*** /path/to/original	timestamp
--- /path/to/new	timestamp
***************
*** 1,3 ****
--- 1,9 ----
+ This is an important
+ notice! It should
+ therefore be located at
+ the beginning of this
+ document!
+
  This part of the
  document has stayed the
  same from version to
***************
*** 8,20 ****
  compress the size of the
  changes.

- This paragraph contains
- text that is outdated.
- It will be deleted in the
- near future.

  It is important to spell
! check this dokument. On
  the other hand, a
  misspelled word isn't
  the end of the world.
--- 14,21 ----
  compress the size of the
  changes.

  It is important to spell
! check this document. On
  the other hand, a
  misspelled word isn't
  the end of the world.
***************
*** 22,24 ****
--- 23,29 ----
  this paragraph needs to
  be changed. Things can
  be added after it.
+
+ This paragraph contains
+ important new additions
+ to this document.

=== Unified format ===
The unified format (or unidiff) inherits the technical improvements made by the context format, but produces a smaller diff with old and new text presented immediately adjacent. Unified format is usually invoked using the "-u" command-line option. This output is often used as input to the patch program. Many projects specifically request that "diffs" be submitted in the unified format, making unified diff format the most common format for exchange between software developers.

Unified context diffs were originally developed by Wayne Davison in August 1990 (in unidiff which appeared in Volume 14 of comp.sources.misc). Richard Stallman added unified diff support to the GNU Project's diff one month later. The feature debuted in GNU diff 1.15, released in January 1991. GNU diff has since generalized the context format to allow arbitrary formatting of diffs.

The format starts with the same two-line header as the context format, except that the original file is preceded by "---" and the new file is preceded by "+++". Following this are one or more change hunks that contain the line differences in the file. A space character precedes the unchanged, contextual lines, a plus sign precedes addition lines, and a minus sign precedes deletion lines.

A hunk begins with range information; it immediately precedes the line additions, line deletions, and any number of contextual lines. The range information is surrounded by double at signs and combines onto one line what appears on two lines in the context format (above). The format of the range information line is as follows:

@@ -l,s +l,s @@ optional section heading

The hunk range information contains two hunk ranges. A minus symbol precedes the range for the hunk of the original file, and a plus symbol precedes the range for the new file. Each hunk range is of the format l,s where l is the starting line number and s is the number of lines the change hunk applies to for each respective file. In many versions of GNU diff, each range can omit the comma and trailing value s, in which case s defaults to 1. Note that the only really interesting value is the l line number of the first range; all the other values can be computed from the diff.

The hunk range for the original should be the sum of all contextual and deletion (including changed) hunk lines. The hunk range for the new file should be a sum of all contextual and addition (including changed) hunk lines. If hunk size information does not correspond with the number of lines in the hunk, then the diff could be considered invalid and rejected.

Optionally, the hunk range can be followed by the heading of the section or function that the hunk is part of. This is mainly useful to make the diff easier to read. When creating a diff with GNU diff, the heading is identified by regular expression matching.

If a line is modified, it is represented as a deletion and addition. Since the hunks of the original and new file appear in the same hunk, such changes would appear adjacent to one another. An occurrence of this in the example below is:

-check this dokument. On
+check this document. On

The command diff -u original new produces the following output:

--- /path/to/original	timestamp
+++ /path/to/new	timestamp
@@ -1,3 +1,9 @@
+This is an important
+notice! It should
+therefore be located at
+the beginning of this
+document!
+
 This part of the
 document has stayed the
 same from version to
@@ -8,13 +14,8 @@
 compress the size of the
 changes.

-This paragraph contains
-text that is outdated.
-It will be deleted in the
-near future.
-
 It is important to spell
-check this dokument. On
+check this document. On
 the other hand, a
 misspelled word isn't
 the end of the world.
@@ -22,3 +23,7 @@
 this paragraph needs to
 be changed. Things can
 be added after it.
+
+This paragraph contains
+important new additions
+to this document.

To successfully separate the file names from the timestamps, a tab character serves as the delimiter. This is invisible on screen and can be lost when diffs are copied and pasted from console/terminal screens.

=== Extensions ===
There are some modifications and extensions to the diff formats that are used and understood by certain programs and in certain contexts. For example, some revision control systems—such as Subversion—specify a version number, "working copy", or any other comment instead of or in addition to a timestamp in the diff's header section.

Some tools allow diffs for several different files to be merged into one, using a header for each modified file that may look something like this:

Index: path/to/file.cpp

The special case of files that do not end in a newline is not handled. Neither unidiff nor the POSIX diff standard defines a way to handle this type of file. (Indeed, such files are not "text" files by strict POSIX definitions.) GNU diff and git produce "\ No newline at end of file" (or a translated version) as a diagnostic, but this behavior is not portable. GNU patch does not seem to handle this case, while git-apply does.

The patch program does not necessarily recognize implementation-specific diff output. However, GNU patch recognizes git patches and will act a little differently.

== Implementations and related programs ==
Changes since 1975 include improvements to the core algorithm, the addition of useful features to the command, and the design of new output formats. The basic algorithm is described in the papers An O(ND) Difference Algorithm and its Variations by Eugene W. Myers and in A File Comparison Program by Webb Miller and Myers. The algorithm was independently discovered and described in Algorithms for Approximate String Matching, by Esko Ukkonen. The first editions of the diff program were designed for line comparisons of text files, expecting the newline character to delimit lines. By the 1980s, support for binary files shifted the application's design and implementation.

GNU diff and diff3 are included in the diffutils package with other diff and patch related utilities.

=== Formatters and front-ends ===
Postprocessors sdiff and diffmk render side-by-side diff listings and applied change marks to printed documents, respectively. Both were developed elsewhere in Bell Labs in or before 1981.

Diff3 compares one file against two other files by reconciling two diffs. It was originally conceived by Paul Jensen to reconcile changes made by two people editing a common source. It is also used by revision control systems, e.g. RCS, for merging.

Emacs has Ediff, which shows the changes a patch would provide in a user interface that combines interactive editing and merging capabilities for patch files.

Vim provides vimdiff to compare from two to eight files, with differences highlighted in color. While historically invoking the diff program, modern vim uses git's fork of xdiff library (LibXDiff) code, providing improved speed and functionality.

GNU Wdiff is a front end to diff that shows the words or phrases that changed in a text document of written language even in the presence of word-wrapping or different column widths.

colordiff is a Perl wrapper for 'diff' that produces the same output, but with colorization for added and deleted bits. diff-so-fancy and diff-highlight are newer analogues. "delta" is a Rust rewrite that highlights changes and the underlying code at the same time.

Patchutils contains tools that combine, rearrange, compare, and fix context diffs and unified diffs.

=== Algorithmic derivatives ===
Utilities that compare source files by their syntactic structure have been built mostly as research tools for some programming languages; some are available as commercial tools. In addition, free tools that perform syntax-aware diff include:

- C++: zograscope, AST-based.
- HTML: Daisydiff, html-differ.
- XML: xmldiffpatch by Microsoft and xmldiffmerge for IBM.
- JavaScript: astii (AST-based).
- Multi-language: Pretty Diff (format code and then diff)

spiff is a variant of diff that ignores differences in floating point calculations with roundoff errors and whitespace, both of which are generally irrelevant to source code comparison. Bellcore wrote the original version. An HPUX port is the most current public release. spiff does not support binary files. spiff outputs to the standard output in standard diff format and accepts inputs in the C, Bourne shell, Fortran, Modula-2 and Lisp programming languages.

LibXDiff is an LGPL library that provides an interface to many algorithms from 1998. An improved Myers algorithm with Rabin fingerprint was originally implemented (as of the final release of 2008), but git and libgit2's fork has since expanded the repository with many of its own. One algorithm called "histogram" is generally regarded as better than the original Myers algorithm, both in speed and quality. This is the modern version of LibXDiff used by Vim.

== See also ==
- cmp – File comparison command
- Comparison of file comparison tools
- Delta encoding – Type of data transmission method
- Difference operator – Pattern defining an infinite sequence of numbers
- File Compare – Command-line program that compares multiple files
- History of software configuration management
- Revision control – Managing versions of source code or data
- Software configuration management – Tracking and controlling software changes
- WinDiff – File comparison program by Microsoft
- Ramseyer Rule - standard format for amending legal text
