= Merger doctrine (property law) =

Legal doctrine relating to real property

In the law of real property, the merger doctrine stands for the proposition that the contract for the conveyance of property merges into the deed of conveyance; therefore, any guarantees made in the contract that are not reflected in the deed are extinguished when the deed is conveyed to the buyer of the property.

== Merger at conveyance ==
The merger doctrine traditionally applies only to covenants of title; covenants relating to the physical condition of the property (say, a promise that the furnace is in good working order) will not merge, and will not extinguish. The parties may by contract abrogate the doctrine and provide that some or all terms of the contract survive the closing and delivery of the deed.

== Merger of real property lots ==
The merger also refers to the doctrine whereby "a fee simple estate, once fragmented into present and future interests, can thereafter be reconstituted. 'Merger is the absorption of a lesser estate by a greater estate, and takes place when two distinct estates of greater and lesser rank meet in the same person or class of persons at the same time without any intermediate estate.' " Similarly, a merger doctrine extinguishes an easement by necessity to a landlocked piece of property once that property is sold to one of the adjoining owners, thus extinguishing the necessity. The lack of any property interest removes the necessity and the easement.

The doctrine of merger is used by municipal governments to treat adjacent lots in common ownership as a single lot for land-use and zoning purposes, such as two lots that are nonconforming due to sub-minimal size for development, but would have sufficient size if combined. Although municipalities may themselves misinterpret the rules by which merger occurs, various conditions – spatial arrangement, past development, ownership, and nonconformity – must be met for an actual merger to occur. Furthermore, the rules establishing these conditions differ from state to state, such as a local merger ordinance being required before such mergers may occur.
