= Dean Drako =

American businessman and entrepreneur

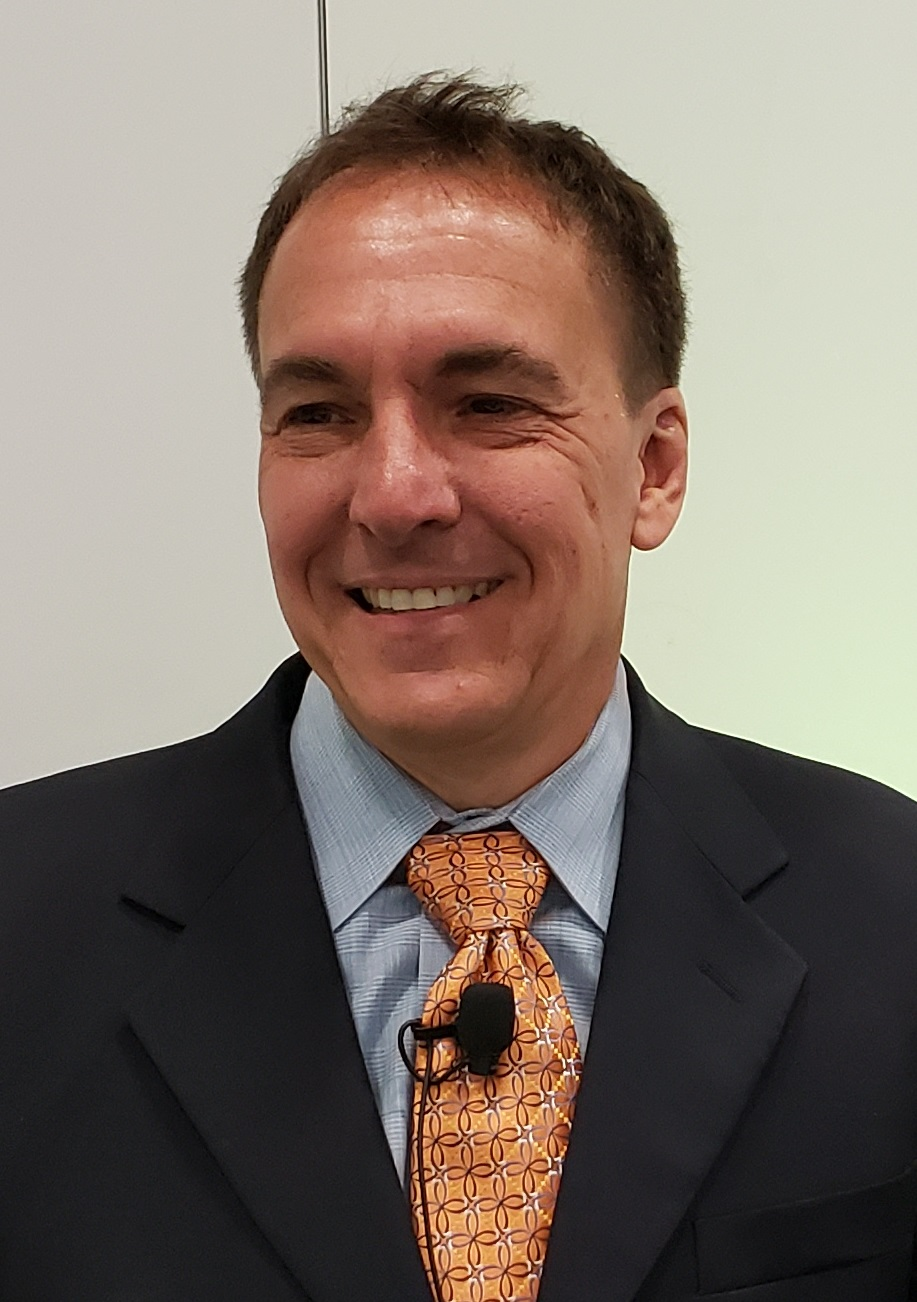
- Drako at the ES Design West 10 July 2019
- Education: University of Michigan (BS, EE); UC Berkeley (MS, EE)
- Title: Owner, CEO of Brivo; Co-founder, CEO of Drako Motors & IC Manage; Owner, Chairman of Cobalt AI, & Swift Sensors; (Past) Owner, Founder, CEO of Eagle Eye Networks; (Past) Founder, CEO of Barracuda Networks
- Website: Linked in

Dean Drako is an American businessman. Drako was founder, president and CEO of Barracuda Networks from 2003 to July 2012. He is owner and CEO of Brivo, and co-founder and CEO of IC Manage and Drako Motors. He is also owner and chairman of Cobalt AI.

== Education ==
Drako grew up in Detroit, Michigan and attended the University of Michigan, where he graduated with a BS in electrical engineering. He later moved to California to attend UC Berkeley, earning an MS in electrical engineering.

== Business career ==
=== DAI and IC Manage ===
Drako has founded two companies in the semiconductor industry. In 1992, Drako founded Design Acceleration Inc, selling it to Cadence Design Systems in 1999. In 2003, he and Shiv Sikand founded IC Manage a design & IP management company. Drako continues as IC Manage's President and CEO.

=== Barracuda Networks ===
Also in 2003, Drako founded Barracuda Networks and introduced their email spam and virus appliance product line. Other Barracuda product lines launched during Drako's tenure were: web filters, load balancers, email archiving, and digital PBXs.

Drako executed six acquisitions by Barracuda Networks: In 2007, NetContinuum, an application controller company; in 2008, BitLeap, a provider of cloud-based backup services, and 3SP, an SSL and VPN company; in 2009, Yosemite Technologies, for incremental backup of applications; a controlling interest in phion AG, an Austria-based public enterprise-class firewalls company, and Purewire Inc, a software as a service (SaaS) cloud-based web filtering and security company. Drako contributed to or supported 16 different open source projects while running Barracuda including Valgrind, Apache, and the Free Software Foundation.

Barracuda was ranked #2 by Glassdoor in 2011, with Drako receiving an 88% approval rating. Drako resigned from Barracuda Networks in July 2012 to found Eagle Eye Networks, while continuing on Barracuda's board of directors until 2014. At the time of Drako’s resignation, Barracuda stated it was profitable, generating hundreds of millions in annual revenue, close to 30% year-over-year growth since inception, and had surpassed 150,000 customers.

=== Eagle Eye Networks ===
Drako left Barracuda Networks in July 2012 to found Eagle Eye Networks, a cloud-based video security company, as CEO. He officially launched Eagle Eye Networks in 2014, stating that his desire to found the company was driven by his frustration when trying to set up a video security system for a remote office while CEO of Barracuda; he wanted to make video surveillance more accessible and far easier to use by leveraging the cloud. Drako has been credited with establishing the concept of ‘true cloud’ in the physical security industry, emphasizing the differences between applications designed specifically for the cloud and legacy-design applications being run on a cloud-hosted virtual server.

Drako initially financed Eagle Eye Networks himself, later raising multiple rounds: an undisclosed amount from Michael Dell in 2014, a $40M series E in 2020, and a $100 million Series F in 2023, with Drako continuing be the majority owner. Drako has stated that more recent funding was to accelerate the company's AI execution. Eagle Eye Networks ranked four times on the Deloitte Technology Fast 500 list of fastest growing technology companies in North America (2019, 2020, 2021, and 2023).

In December 2025, Drako merged Eagle Eye Networks with Brivo, becoming CEO of Brivo.

=== Brivo ===
In 2015, Drako acquired cloud access control system provider Brivo for $50M, as Brivo's Chairman. and operating it as separate entity from Eagle Eye Networks for more than 10 years until the two companies merged in December 2025, with Drako taking on the CEO role for Brivo following the merger.

In November 2022, Brivo closed long-term senior secured credit facility of $75 million with Runway Growth Capital. In 2023, Brivo raised $92M in financing, with Drako continuing to hold a majority share of the company.

=== Cobalt AI acquisition ===
In June 2024, Drako acquired Cobalt AI, a provider of enterprise AI alarm filtering, remote monitoring and security robot solutions, for an undisclosed sum, where he also is chairman.

=== Drako Motors ===
Drako is co-founder and CEO of Drako Motors, an automotive software platform provider, which on August 6, 2015 announced its first product, the Drako DriveOS, a single VCU (vehicle control unit) operating system which controls all four wheels independently. In June 2019, Drako Motors pre-announced their Drako GTE electric quad-motor supercar, claiming speeds of up to 206 MPH and 1200 horsepower. In August 2019, Drako Motors formally launched the all-electric production Drako GTE. In November 2022, Drako Motors launched the Drako Dragon all-electric luxury SUV, with 2,000 HP and 200+ mph maximum speed, quad motor powertrain, and two gullwing doors.

=== PermRecord and Permanent Legacy Foundation ===
In 2015, Drako created the PermRecord Foundation with the stated purpose "to ensure the preservation of materials placed in its trust." By 2019 this mission had evolved "to preserve and provide perpetual access to the digital legacy of all people for the historical and educational benefit of future generations." As of 2023, there were 7 board members, and Drako had the exclusive right to set the number of authorized directors, elect, and remove directors. The foundation accepts donations and is supported by contributions; its website displays its legal name and charity registration.

== Awards and recognition ==
Drako has been named a winner of the Ernst & Young Entrepreneur of the Year Award twice: first, as CEO of Barracuda Networks (Northern California, Networking and Communications) in 2007, and later as CEO of Eagle Eye Networks (Gulf South Region) in 2024. In 2014, Goldman Sachs included Drako in its list of the 100 Most Intriguing Entrepreneurs.

Drako has been on the University of Michigan Advisory Council since 2012 and was the commencement speaker for University of Michigan Engineering School in 2016. In 2014, he was UC Berkeley's Engineering Week keynote speaker, where he discussed his five principles of entrepreneurship. He has also been an invited speaker for UC Berkeley's Richard Newton lecture series.

He was elected five times to the board of directors of the ESD Alliance, from 2012 to 2023.
