= Eagle Eye (disambiguation) =

Eagle Eye is a 2008 American film.

Eagle Eye or eagle eye may also refer to:

== Arts, media and entertainment ==
- Eagle Eye Mysteries, a 1993 series of educational computer games
- "Eagle Eye", a song by Tarja Turunen from The Brightest Void
- "Eagle Eye", a song by American rock band Heatmiser from Mic City Sons
- The Eagle's Eye, 1918 serial film
- Eagle Eye (Transformers), a character in the Transformers franchise
- Eagle-Eye, Heroic Warrior from Supernaturals (toy line)

=== Newspapers ===
- Jackson Eagle Eye, a former African American newspaper from Mississippi, US
- The Eagle Eye, the newspaper of Lock Haven University of Pennsylvania, US

== Organizations ==
- Eagle Eye Networks, an American video surveillance provider
- Eagle Eye Technologies, now SkyBitz, an American asset tracking service company

== People ==
- Eagle-Eye Cherry (born 1968), American-Swedish musician
- Mark Allen (snooker player) (born 1986), Northern Irish snooker player

== Other uses ==
- Eagle eye, the visual organ of the eagle
- Bell Eagle Eye, an American unmanned aerial vehicle
- Operation Eagle Eye (disambiguation)
- EagleEye (satellite), the first satellite designed and operated by the Polish government

== See also ==
- Eye of the Eagle (disambiguation)
- Eagle Vision (disambiguation)
