= IC Manage =

American software company

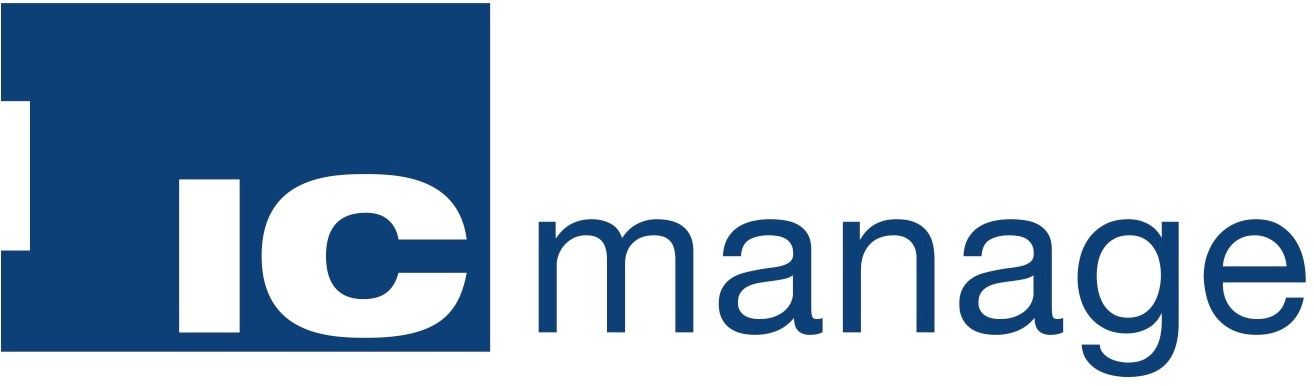
- Type: Private
- Industry: Software Configuration Management
- Founded: 2002
- Headquarters: Campbell, California
- Key people: CEO: Dean Drako EVP: Shiv Sikand
- Website: www.icmanage.com

IC Manage is a company that provides design data and IP management, Big Data Analytics, Hybrid Cloud Bursting, and High-Performance Computing software to semiconductors, systems, Internet of Things and artificial intelligence IC companies.

== History ==
In 2003, IC Manage was founded by Shiv Sikand and Dean Drako.

In 2004, IC Manage introduced the beta version of its commercial design data management software system that provided version control, configuration management, and software bug tracking. The design management system included a graphical Cadence Design Framework user interface and worked with both the Cadence and the OpenAccess databases. It tracked only modified files and stored metadata about revisions and configurations in a relational database separate from the design data.

In 2007, IC Manage announced its Global Design Platform (GDP) design data management system. GDP had bi-directional component tracking for IC revisions and derivatives; mixing, match, and reuse of components and semiconductor intellectual property cores across local and remote design sites; defect tracking and workspace synchronization to the same state when a designer reported, fixed, or verified a software bug.

In 2007, Nvidia manufactured over 100 chips that used IC Manage software during design.

In 2009, IC Manage content management software was mentioned as a technology driver enabling semiconductor companies to do design work across local and remote geographic locations, as part of a significant trend toward outsourcing design work to other countries. IC Manage's software creates a workspace that abstracts the design data from the underlying directory organization.

In 2011, DeepChip.com ranked IC Manage IP Central (IP Pro) as the #1 item to see at the Design Automation Conference.

From 2010 through 2014, IC Manage has been included in the annual "What to See at DAC" list by the GarySmith EDA analyst firm. In 2010 for Enterprise Tools, in 2011 for Design Management, in 2012 and 2013 for Design Debug, and 2014 for Enterprise tools.

In 2014, IC Manage was selected as one of Deloitte Fast 500, a ranking of the 500 fastest growing technology, media, telecommunications, life sciences and clean technology companies in North America. IC Manage grew 178 percent during the 4 years from 2008 to 2012.

In 2015, Design Automation Conference attendees ranked IC Manage Envision Design Progress Analytics as the #1 item at the conference.

In 2016, Design Automation Conference attendees ranked IC Manage as #3 at the conference, based on its software application accelerator product.

In 2018, DeepChip.com ranked IC Manage PeerCache for hybrid cloud bursting as one of 3 companies in the #1 group to see at the Design Automation Conference. Pedestal Research also included IC Manage in its 2018 What to See at DAC list.

In 2022, IC Manage announced IC Manage Holodeck high-performance computing product works with Microsoft Azure and Amazon AWS.

== Products ==
- Global Design Platform (GDP) - In April 2007, IC Manage announced its Global Design Platform (GDP) design data management system.
- IP Central/ IP Pro - In June 2011, the company introduced its IP Central platform targeted to design and verification teams for IP reuse, including publishing, sharing and integration and revisions of internal and third-party IP, and IP bug dependency tracing.
- IC Manage Views – In May 2012, the company announced its IC Manage Views workspace acceleration software, a version aware file system which presents complete virtual workspace views, and transfers data on demand to a local file cache.
- IC Manage Envision Design Progress Analytics - In May 2015, the company announced its IC Manage Envision Big Data Predictive Analytics, providing real-time design progress analytics for predicting and managing projects.
- IC Manage PeerCache. In May 2016, IC Manage first presented its PeerCache for the application I/O speedup. In May 2018, IC Manage presented details on PeerCache for Hybrid Cloud Bursting.
- IC Manage Envision Verification Analytics - In December 2017, the company announced its IC Manage Envision Verification Analytics, to help companies allocate their resources in near real-time to accelerate their verification schedules, including identifying verification bottlenecks with specific design changes. The company also announced its Big Data Labs.
- IC Manage GDP-XL - In March 2018, the company released its IC Manage GDP-XL design & IP management system, including a Git API.
- IC Manage Holodeck HPC product provides access to cloud-compute capacity and hybrid cloud bursting by virtually projecting terabyte/petabyte NFS file systems, and transferring only the specific data segments required by the job.

== Customer applications ==
The following semiconductor companies have discussed applications for IC Manage's technologies at conferences.

- Broadcom, AMD, and Nvidia on IP Reuse.
- Cambridge Silicon Radio, Broadcom, and Xilinx on IP-based Design and Verification Reuse.
- Juniper, Cypress Semiconductor, and Spreadtrum on Multi-site design, DM migration & workspace acceleration.
- Xilinx on Big Data for design progress.

== See also ==
- List of revision control software
