= Yos =

Yos or YOS may refer to:

- Owen Sound Billy Bishop Regional Airport (IATA Code: YOS), in Owen Sound, Ontario, Canada
- YÖS exam, Turkish entrance examination
- Yos Sudarso, Indonesian naval officer
- Yos Por, Cambodian politician
- Yos Son, Cambodian politician
- Somporn Yos, Thai footballer
- A US Navy hull classification symbol: Oil storage barge (YOS)

== See also ==
- Yos Sudarso Island in Papua province, Indonesia
- Yos Sudarso Bay in Indonesia
- Yot (disambiguation)
- Yosemite (disambiguation)
