= Yosano (disambiguation) =

Yosano, Kyoto is a town in Japan.

Yosano may also refer to:

- Akiko Yosano (与謝野 晶子, 1878–1942), Japanese author, wife of Tekkan Yosano
- Kaoru Yosano (与謝野 馨, 1938–2017), Japanese politician, grandson of Akiko and Tekkan Yosano
- Tekkan Yosano (与謝野 鉄幹, 1873–1935), Japanese author, husband of Akiko Yosano
- Yosano Station, Railway station in Yosano, Kyoto Prefecture, Japan

== People ==
- Yosano Akiko, Japanese tanka poet
- Tekkan Yosano, Japanese author and poet

== See also ==
- Yos (disambiguation)
