= Eagle Eye Networks =

American cloud-based video surveillance firm

- Industry: Video surveillance Physical security
- Founded: 2012; 14 years ago
- Founder: Dean Drako
- Fate: Merged with Brivo in December 2025
- Headquarters: Austin, Texas, United States
- Number of locations: 4 (2023)
- Area served: Worldwide
- Key people: Founder & CEO; Dean Drako
- Products: Cloud video surveillance system, Video API
- Number of employees: 487 (2023)
- Website: www.een.com

Eagle Eye Networks, Inc. (EEN) was an American company providing cloud-based video surveillance products for physical security and business operations applications. In 2025, Eagle Eye merged with Brivo to form a single company, operating under the Brivo name.

== History ==
Eagle Eye Networks was founded in 2012 by Dean Drako, Barracuda Networks' founder and former CEO. Drako said he started the company after frustrations with trying to deploy and use existing video surveillance systems for remote management while he was CEO of Barracuda.

The company and its first product, the Eagle Eye Cloud Security Camera Video Management System, were announced in January 2014. The company announced its channel partner program the following month.

Eagle Eye Networks announced a multimillion-dollar series B venture round investment in July 2014, including an investment by Michael Dell's private family venture fund, MSD Capital. Michael Dell stated that he made the investment primarily because of CEO Drako's earlier success with Barracuda Networks. Enrique Salem, previous CEO of Symantec and Austin Ventures also invested in the round.

The company announced a new data center in Austin, Texas in September 2014.

In February 2015, Diebold, financial self-service, security and services corporation, and Eagle Eye Networks announced an alliance to deliver cloud-based video services which would stream and store live and recorded video, generate notifications and support real-time analytics. According to Diebold, EEN had developed the industry's first cloud-based video solution with an open API.

CEO Drako bought Brivo cloud access control company for $50 million in June 2015. Drako said he saw the opportunity to accelerate the cloud technology shift underway in the physical security industry by integrating Brivo's cloud access control with EEN cloud video surveillance. The two companies continued to operate separately.

In April 2017, EEN and Swift Sensors announced a partnership to deliver cloud-based wireless sensor and video surveillance across multiple industries, enabling users to check video as needed, based on sensor data.

In 2020, EEN raised $40 million in Series E funding from Accel for a total of $100 million since the company was founded in 2012. The company said it planned to use the funding to further develop artificial intelligence (AI) analytics on its cloud-based video surveillance platform, and to continue its growth. In 2023, it partnered with Brivo to raise 192 million to focusing on the use of AI related to physical security.

In 2023, EEN raised $100M in financing from SECOM. Drako continues to own the majority of Eagle Eye. In 2024, Eagle Eyes's CEO Dean Drako was named a winner of the Ernst & Young Entrepreneur of the Year Award for the Gulf South Region.

In December 2025, Eagle Eye Network merged with Brivo, with Dean Drako as CEO of the new company, which operates under the name Brivo.

== Products ==
Eagle Eye Cloud Security Camera Video Management System is a cloud-managed video surveillance system that links analog and IP cameras with an on-site bridge or cloud managed video recorder appliance which transmit the encrypted video recording to Eagle Eye's cloud data center.

The system supports mobile apps for system installation, remote video viewing, and system management, with alerts for motion detection, system tampering and camera malfunction. It also handles bandwidth management, and supports user adjustment of how much video is stored in the cloud or on-premises.

The Eagle Eye Video API is an open RESTful API for integrators and developers to integrate video into their applications. It provides a set of storage, analytics, indexing, and interfaces for building or integrating applications with both live and recorded video.

The company's AI Video Search utilizes artificial intelligence to enable searches for people and objects across all security cameras; the customer types in the description and then narrow results by date, time, location, and camera.

== Recognition ==
The Eagle Eye Networks company launch was discussed in many publications, including MarketWatch, Computerworld, and The Wall Street Journal, regarding the company's focus on simple design and ease of use.

Its cloud-based security camera system received an award for the best new hosted solution from the Security Industry Association in April 2014. The company was listed as a CRN Magazine top 25 emerging company in July 2014.

Eagle Eye's founder and Dean Drako was named to Goldman Sachs' 100 most intriguing entrepreneurs list for 2014.

In November 2019, the Deloitte Technology Fast 500 ranked EEN #133 of the fastest growing technology companies in North America, with 936% growth from 2015 to 2018.

In November 2020, EEN made the Deloitte Technology Fast 500 list of fastest-growing technology companies in North America for the second year in a row. The company ranked #187, with 652% growth from 2016 to 2019.

== Acquisitions ==
=== Timeline ===
Year announced	Company	Business	Value (USD)	References
2017	Panasonic Camera Manager	Cloud video surveillance	Not disclosed	
2021	Uncanny Vision	Video Surveillance AI	Not disclosed	
