= Operation Eagle (disambiguation) =

Operation Eagle was a 2011–2012 Egyptian military campaign in the Sinai Peninsula.

Operation Eagle may also refer to:

- Operation Eagle (Portugal), a 1965 military operation in Mozambique
- Operation Eagle (Sri Lanka), a 1990 Sri Lanka Air Force rescue mission
- Operation Eagle (Kosovo War), a 1998 military operation launched by the KLA

== See also ==
- Operation Eagle Assist (2001)
- Operation Eagle Attack (1940)
- Operation Eagle Claw (1980)
- Operation Eagle Curtain (2003)
- Operation Eagle Dive I (2007)
- Operation Eagle Eye (disambiguation)
- Operation Eagle Fury (2003)
- Operation Eagle Guardian (2010)
- Operation Eagle Lightning (2007)
- Operation Eagle Pull (1975)
- Operation Eagle's Summit (2008)
- Operation Eagle Sweep (2007)
- Operation Eagle Talon (2007)
- Operation Eagle Venture IV (2007)
- Operation Eagle Watch (2006)
