= Yosemite (disambiguation) =

Yosemite National Park is a national park in the United States.

Yosemite may also refer to:

== Places ==
- Yosemite, New South Wales, Australia
- Yosemite, Kentucky, U.S.
- Yosemite Valley, a glacial valley
- Yosemite Rock, a Phantom Island in the Pacific Ocean

== Transportation ==
- USS Yosemite (1892), an auxiliary cruiser
- USS Yosemite (1894), a steamer
- USS Yosemite (CM-2), a minelayer that bore the name from 1931 to 1939
- USS Yosemite (AD-19), a destroyer tender in commission from 1944 to 1994
- Yosemite (sidewheeler), a steamboat that operated in California, Washington, and British Columbia

== Arts and entertainment ==
- Yosemite (film), a 2015 film
- "Yosemite" (Travis Scott song), 2018
- "Yosemite" (Kettama and Interplanetary Criminal song), 2024
- "Yosemite", a 2021 song by Lana Del Rey from Chemtrails over the Country Club
- "Yosemite (Song for the Ahwahnechee)", a 2023 song by Iniko from The Awakening
- The Yosemite, a 1912 book by John Muir
- Yosemite Entertainment, a division of Sierra Entertainment
- Yosemite Sam, a cartoon character

== Software ==
- OS X Yosemite, Mac OS X version 10.10
- Yosemite Server Backup, a cross-platform backup software

== See also ==
- List of Yosemite destinations
- Yosemite bowline, a knot
- Yosemite Decimal System, a system for rating walks, hikes, and climbs
- Yosemite Lakes, California
- Yosemite Mountain Sugar Pine Railroad
- Yosemite Valley, California, a census area
- Yosemite Village, California
