= Brivo =

Company

Brivo, Inc.
- Type: Private
- Industry: Physical security
- Headquarters: Bethesda, Maryland & Austin, Texas, United States
- Area served: Worldwide
- Key people: Dean Drako (CEO, chairman, owner); Steve Van Till (president); Carter Griffin (co-founder); Tim Ogilvie (co-founder); Mark Stein (co-founder)
- Products: Cloud native access control and video management systems with AI
- Website: www.brivo.com

Brivo, Inc. is a cloud AI physical security company providing access control, video surveillance, visitor management, and intrusion detection.

== Executive Leadership ==
Dean Drako is CEO and chairman, and Steve Van Till is president.

== History ==
Brivo was co-founded in 1999 by Carter Griffin, Tim Ogilvie and Mark Stein. After completing a series A financing round of individual investors, the company secured an investment from IDEO Ventures, whose affiliate IDEO product design became its development partner for Brivo's first product – a last mile delivery solution for unattended and asynchronous delivery of parcels. In 2002, Griffin, Ogilvie and Stein transitioned the company to what became Brivo's primary market with the introduction of Brivo's building access control SaaS platform. In 2002, Brivo introduced cloud-based access control to the physical security market. The physical access control system works with door card readers and similar devices, and locks or unlock things once an individual has been authenticated.

Brivo released the ACS5000 access control system in 2005, with Ethernet and GSM cellular connectivity options. In 2007, Brivo introduced its XML application programming interface (API). In 2017, Brivo introduced the availability of two new door access controllers, the ACS6000 and the ACS300, to complement its existing product lines, as well as integration with the Authentic Mercury open platform.

Brivo introduced its IP door controller (IPDC) in 2011, an Ethernet access control panel in a compact form factor, with power over Ethernet and FIPS 140-2 validated encryption. IPDC used standard network cabling to the door. In 2013, Brivo announced Brivo Onair, a cloud-based access control and video surveillance physical security system for businesses that automates facility access from one interface.

As of 2015, Brivo stated its cloud-based access control system serviced more than ten million users and more 100,000 access points, such as doors and windows.

In November 2022, Runway Growth Capital announced the closure of a long-term senior secured credit facility of $75 million to Brivo.

In 2023, Brivo raised $92M in financing from SECOM.

== Products ==
- Brivo Access. Smart building tool built into the cloud-based Brivo access control platform that organizes and structures data to see events, patterns, with custom reports and charts.
- Brivo Snapshot. Video analytics & forensic product for facial and person detection, using machine learning on combined access control and video data streams.

== Private acquisition ==
In June 2015, Brivo was acquired by Dean Drako, Barracuda Networks founder and former CEO, and president and CEO of Eagle Eye Networks. Drako is Brivo's chairman.

Drako said he saw the opportunity to accelerate the cloud technology shift underway in the physical security industry by combining Brivo's cloud access control with cloud video surveillance from his company Eagle Eye Networks. The two companies will continue to operate as separate entities.

== Mergers & Acquisitions ==
In March 2020, Brivo announced it acquired Parakeet IoT company as part of its expansion into smart buildings.

In December 2025, Brivo and Eagle Eye Networks announced that the two companies had merged, and would operate under the name Brivo. Dean Drako is CEO of the combined company, with Steve Van Till, Brivo's prior CEO, president.

== Recognition ==
Gartner named Brivo a “Cool Vendor in Identity and Access Management" for 2014. In the same year, Brivo also released its Social Access Management API.

At the 2018 ISC West Conference, Brivo ACS300 Wireless Access Controller won best product in the “Access Control Software & Controllers” category.
