= Eagle Vision (disambiguation) =

Eagle Vision may refer to:

- Eagle Vision, a car model, Vision, made by Chrysler under the brand Eagle
- Eagle Vision (company), a Canadian TV and film production company
- Eagle Vision, a division of Eagle Rock Entertainment
- Vision of eagles, see eagle eye

== See also ==
- Bird vision
- Eye of the Eagle (disambiguation)
- Eagle Eye (disambiguation)
