= Eye of the Eagle =

Eye of the Eagle may refer to:

- eagle eye, the eye of the eagle (the bird)
- Eye of the Eagle (album), a 1998 album by Dave Bainbridge and Dave Fitzgerald
- Eye of the Eagle (1987 film), an American action film
- Eye of the Eagle (1997 film) (Danish: Ørnens Øje), a Danish adventure film

== See also ==
- Eagle Eye (disambiguation)
- Eagle Vision (disambiguation)
