= Drako GTE =

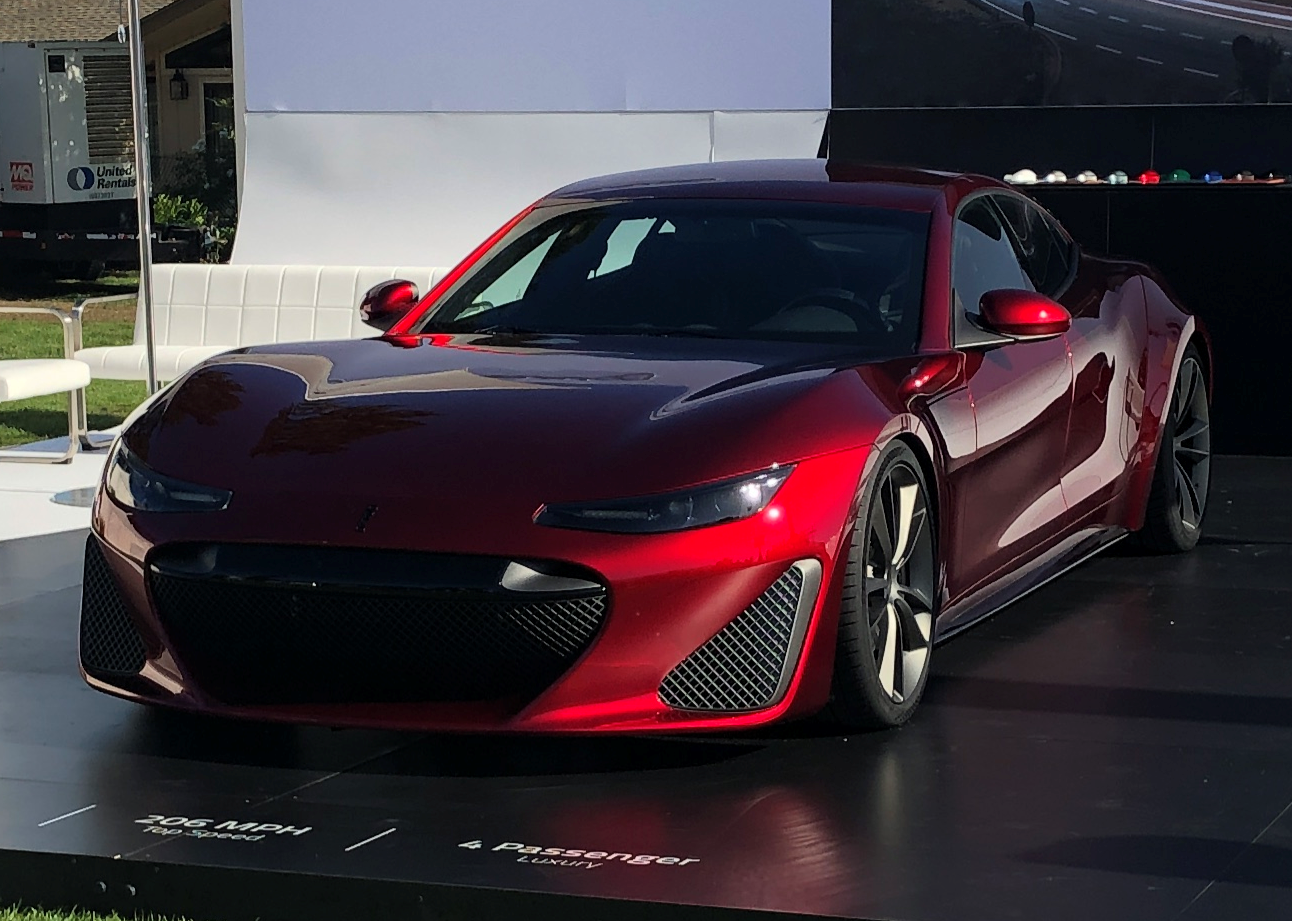

Overview
- Manufacturer: Drako Motors
- Production: 2019–present (25 produced)
- Model years: 2020-present
- Assembly: San Jose, California, USA
- Designer: Lowie Vermeersch at Granstudio

Body and chassis
- Class: Full-size luxury sports sedan (F)
- Body style: 4-door saloon
- Layout: Quad-motor, four-wheel-drive layout

Powertrain
- Electric motor: 225 kW four electric motors
- Power output: 895 kW (1,217 PS; 1,200 hp)
- Transmission: 2 speed
- Battery: 90 kWh lithium-ion battery
- Electric range: 402 km (250 mi)

Dimensions
- Wheelbase: 3,159 mm (124.4 in)
- Length: 5,105 mm (201.0 in)
- Width: 2,065 mm (81.3 in)
- Height: 1,305 mm (51.4 in)
- Kerb weight: 2,404 kg (5,300 lb)

The Drako GTE is an electric luxury sports sedan manufactured by Drako Motors.

== History ==
In August 2019, the American company Drako Motors presented its first series vehicle in the form of an electric full-size luxury sedan.

The GTE is based on the Karma Revero GT model (a derivative of the Fisker Karma). Similarly to it, it adopted the characteristic proportions of the oblong bonnet, massive wheel arches and a short rear overhang. The front apron has a large imitation of the air intake in the shape of a rounded hexagon, while the headlights took the form of aggressively stylized. The GTE was released in 2020 in a limited series of 25 copies. The price per unit is approximately US$1.2 million.

== Specifications ==
The GTE has a drive system consisting of four electric motors, each with a power output of 225 kW (306 PS; 302 hp). The total power of the vehicle is 1,200 hp (895 kW; 1,217 PS), the maximum torque is 8,800 N⋅m (6,491 lb⋅ft; 897 kg⋅m), while the maximum speed is 332 km/h (206 mph). The 90 kWh battery allows to reach 402 kilometres (250 mi) of range on a single charge.
