= Drako Motors =

American luxury sports car manufacturer based in San Jose, California

Drako Motors, Inc.
- Type: Private
- Industry: Automotive
- Headquarters: San Jose, California, United States
- Area served: Worldwide
- Key people: Dean Drako (founder and CEO); Shiv Sikand (founder and EVP)
- Products: Drako GTE
- Website: drakomotors.com

Drako Motors, Inc. is an American luxury sports car manufacturer based in San Jose, California. Drako Motors produces the Drako GTE, an electric sports car.

== History ==
Drako Motors was founded in 2013 by Dean Drako and Shiv Sikand. The company announced its DriveOS four-wheel torque vectoring, single-VCU drive operating system in August 2015.

== Drako GTE ==
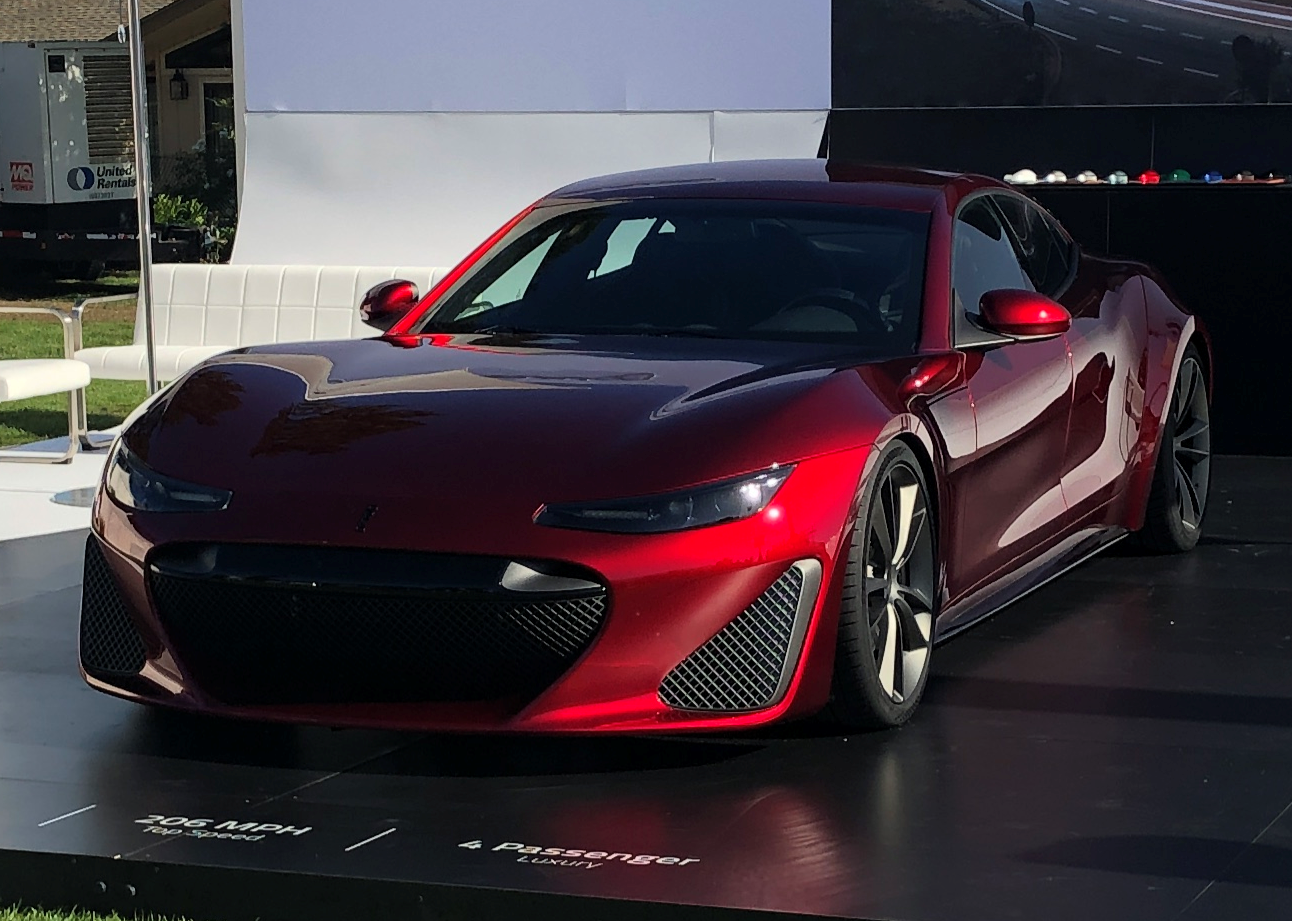
Drako GTE at The Quail in 2019

In 2019, Drako Motors announced its Drako GTE production at The Quail Motorsport. The Drako GTE is an all-electric, quad motor, full-size 4 door sports sedan that seats 4 passengers. The GTE has a claimed top speed of 206 mph (332 km/h) and a 0-60 mph (97 km/h) time of less than 3 seconds. Drako Motors announced a limited production of 25 Drako GTE vehicles in 2020, with a base price of US$1,250,000.

== Drako Dragon ==
In November 2022, the company officially launched the Drako Dragon all-electric luxury SUV, with 2,000 HP, 200+ mph maximum speed, a 420-mile range, 500 kW fast charging, and a quad motor powertrain. The Drako Dragon has a base price of US$290,000.
