= Operation Eagle Eye =

Operation Eagle Eye may refer to:

- Operation Eagle Eye (United States), a racial profiling campaign in the 1960s in Arizona
- Operation Eagle Eye (Kosovo), an unarmed aerial operation in the 1990s in the lead up to the 1999 Kosovo War

== See also ==
- Eagle Eye (disambiguation)
- Operation Eagle (disambiguation)
