= Yos Por =

Cambodian politician

Yos Por (Khmer: យស់ ព័រ), a Cambodian communist politician.

In 1963 Por was one of 40 Hanoi-based Khmers who travelled to China for a 4-year political training course. In the midst of the Cultural Revolution, Por chose to leave China in 1967.

In 1970 Por was included into the Kampot (Region 35) committee of the Communist Party of Kampuchea. He was put in charge of Education and Information. In 1972 the party leadership around Pol Pot began targeting Khmer communists who, like Por, had stayed in Vietnam. The returnees from Vietnam were removed from party positions and many, including Por, were subjected to humiliation and accusations of revisionism.

Yos Por fled to Vietnam. Following the overthrow of the Pol Pot-regime, Por became the general secretary of the Kampuchean United Front for National Salvation (KUFNS or FUNSK) in 1979. He would also become the head of the PRK-USSR Friendship Association.
