= Operation Eagle (Portugal) =

- Part of Mozambican War of Independence
Date	2 July – 6 September 1965
Location	Niassa, Mozambique
Result	Portuguese victory

Belligerents
Portugal	(Mozambique) FRELIMO

Commanders and leaders
(Portugal) Unknown	(Mozambique) Unknown

Units involved
(Portugal) Forças Armadas: Portuguese Army; Portuguese Air Force	Unknown

Strength
Unknown	Unknown

Casualties and losses
10+ killed 45+ wounded	Unknown

Operation Eagle (Portuguese: Operação Águia) was the first organised operation of the Portuguese Armed Forces in response to the attack of the FRELIMO guerrilla group, on 25 September 1964, to the administrative post of Chai, in the district of Cabo Delgado, materialising therefore in the first operation in the one of Portuguese Colonial War in the theatre of operations of Mozambique.

== Background ==
The attack by the Frelimo guerrilla group on 25 September 1964 to the Chai administrative post in the Cabo Delgado district is celebrated as the official date for the beginning of the armed struggle in Mozambique. Although violent actions by Mozambican nationalists occurred earlier, it is from that moment that the fight spread throughout the North of the colony. The response of Portuguese forces to this situation was identical to their response in Guinea and Angola creating a mesh of grid forces, which could be tightened as needed, installing battalions and companies at key points, and carrying out actions control of populations, patrols to ensure the security of communication routes and offensive operations with the aim of destroying the bases of guerrilla groups.

Operation Eagle was developed in a similar way to Operation Trident: an initial phase with the maximum number of personnel available for offensive actions and occupation of key points, with the establishment of operational bases, followed by surface actions, carried out permanently by units of and finally permanent occupation of the area by grid units. This would, moreover, be a mode of action often used by Portuguese forces whenever the enemy did not have the capacity to outdo these units.

== The operation ==
The military in the Cabo Delgado area was centered on and around Mueda, the traditional capital of the Macondes plateau, which is the point of convergence of all major communication routes:

- The road that connects the plateau to the sea, coming from Mocímboa da Praia.
- To the north, to Tanzania, through Mocímboa do Rovuma.
- To the south, towards Montepuez and Pemba (Porto Amélia).
- To the interior of the plateau, for Nangolo and Muidumbe.

Grouping 23 was formed to carry out the operation, which consisted of two battalions of hunters, the 558 and the A (Battalion of Hunters of Nampula) and by a battery of artillery of 8.8 mm guns. The guerrillas first sought to hinder the military’s actions, by conducting ambushes of patrols and actions of flogging columns

On 1 July, Miteda base was attacked by the guerrillas. On 2 July, the Portuguese were ambushed. On 3 July, an attack against the Portuguese military base of Muatide occurred. These ambushes resulted in heavy casualties for the Portuguese forces, four were killed and eighteen were wounded.

On 8 July the guerrillas triggered a Portuguese artillery and aviation bombardment on the Mitea-Nangololo-Muatide triangle, accompanied by ambushes on the likely lines of withdrawal of the guerrillas. On 12 July an Auster aircraft targeted guerrilla positions. On the 14th, 16th, 17th, 18th, 20th, 21st, 22nd, 29th, and 30th of the same month, Portuguese columns were ambushed.

On 31 July six soldiers were killed and twenty-seven soldiers were wounded. At the end of July, the operation was broken up into smaller units with the designations of White Eagle, Yellow Eagle (Águia d'Ouro and Águia Vermelha) thus continuing until 6 September, when the operation officially ended.
