= Yot =

Yot or YOT may refer to:

- Short I (Й й), a letter of the Cyrillic alphabet
- Yot (letter), an alternate name for the letter J j in context of Greek script
- Yotvata Airfield in Israel (IATA Code: YOT)
- Youth Offending Team (YOT), in England and Wales, that monitors young offenders
- Youth of Today, a youth crew/hardcore punk band from Connecticut
- Yotti language (ISO 639-3 code: yot)
- Yot, Song Khwae, Nan Province, Thailand

== See also ==
- Yacht, recreational boat
- Yeot, Hangwa variety in McCune–Reischauer romanisation
