= Yosemite, New South Wales =

Locality in Australia

Yosemite New South Wales
- Coordinates: 33°42′S 150°19′E
- Postcode(s): 2780
- LGA(s): City of Blue Mountains

Yosemite is an unbounded locality within the locality of Katoomba and to the north of the township of Katoomba in the state of New South Wales, Australia in the City of Blue Mountains. It has been known as "Yosemite Valley", "Yosemite Park" and North Katoomba.

Yosemite Valley Post Office was opened on 14 May 1928 and closed in 1956. There is currently an Australia Post distribution centre operating from Minni Ha Ha Road.

It is home to Katoomba and Yosemite creeks and also the "Minnehaha falls". Also known as "Yosemite Park" it is home to thousands of residents, and has its own local school and a cafe. There are a number of parks, a local community garden and a school. The area is surrounded by typical Australian bushland and sandstone cliffs. It was developed from the early 1900s and has been steadily increasing in population until the present day, with very little free land remaining. To the north are many kilometres of bush track. The tracks were popular with horse riders and motorbike riders but have since been closed down by council to anything but bushwalkers.
