= Barracuda Networks =

American software company

- Type: Private
- Industry: Information Security
- Founded: 2003; 23 years ago
- Founders: Dean Drako, Michael Perone, and Zach Levow
- Headquarters: Campbell, California, U.S.
- Key people: Rohit Ghai (CEO)
- Owner: KKR
- Number of employees: 1001-5000
- Website: barracuda.com

Barracuda Networks, Inc. provides security, networking and storage products based on network appliances and cloud services.

== History ==
Barracuda Networks was founded in 2003 by CEO Dean Drako, Michael Perone, and Zach Levow, and the company introduced the Barracuda Spam and Virus Firewall in the same year. In January 2006, it closed its first outside investment of $40 million from Sequoia Capital and Francisco Partners. In 2007, the company moved its headquarters to Campbell, California, and opened an office in Ann Arbor, Michigan.

Barracuda Networks expanded its research and development facility in Ann Arbor to a 12,500 square foot office building on Depot Street in 2008. By 2012, the Michigan-based research division had grown to about 180 employees, again outgrowing its space. In June 2012, Barracuda signed a lease to occupy the 45,000 square foot office complex previously used as the Borders headquarters on Maynard St in downtown Ann Arbor.

On January 29, 2008, Barracuda Networks was sued by Trend Micro over its use of the open source anti-virus software Clam AntiVirus, which Trend Micro claimed to be in violation of its patent on 'anti-virus detection on an SMTP or FTP gateway'. In addition to providing samples of prior art in an effort to render Trend Micro's patent invalid, in July 2008 Barracuda launched a countersuit against Trend Micro claiming Trend Micro violated several antivirus patents Barracuda Networks had acquired from IBM. In July 2012, co-founder Drako resigned his operating position but remained on the company's board of directors. In November 2012, long-time EMC executive William "BJ" Jenkins joined the company as president and CEO.

In November 2013, Barracuda Networks went public on the New York Stock Exchange under the ticker symbol CUDA.

In February 2018, private equity firm Thoma Bravo acquired Barracuda Networks in a $1.6 billion buyout. In April 2022, KKR announced the signing of an agreement to purchase Barracuda Networks from Thoma Bravo for about $4 billion, which was completed in August of that year. In May 2025, Barracuda Networks appointed Michelle Hodges as Senior Vice President of Global Channels and Alliances.

=== Releases ===
In December 2008, the company launched the BRBL (Barracuda Reputation Block List), its proprietary and dynamic list of known spam servers, for free and public use in blocking spam at the gateway.

In November 2015, Barracuda added a new Next Generation Firewall to its firewall family.

In 2025, Barracuda Networks released BarracudaONE, an AI-powered cybersecurity product that consolidates email protection, data backup, threat detection, and extended detection and response.

== Acquisitions ==
- In September 2007, Barracuda Networks acquired NetContinuum, which provides application controllers to secure and manage enterprise web applications.
- In November 2008, Barracuda Networks acquired BitLeap and 3SP.
- In January 2009, Barracuda Networks acquired Yosemite Technologies to add software agents for incremental backups of applications such as Microsoft Exchange Server and SQL Server, and Windows system states.
- In September 2009, Barracuda Networks acquired controlling interest in phion AG, an Austria-based public company delivering enterprise-class firewalls. A month later, in October, the company acquired Purewire Inc, a software as a service (SaaS) company offering cloud-based web filtering and security.
- In May 2013, Barracuda Networks acquired SignNow.
- In 2014, Barracuda Networks purchased C2C Systems UK.
- In October 2015, Barracuda Networks acquired Intronis.
- In November 2017, Barracuda purchased Sonian. In the same month, Barracuda announced that it was being acquired by private equity investment firm Thoma Bravo, LLC.
- In January 2018, Barracuda acquired PhishLine.
- In November 2020, the company acquired security startup Fyde.
- In July 2021, Barracuda Networks acquired SKOUT Cybersecurity.
- In April 2022, KKR purchased Barracuda Networks from Thoma Bravo for a reported $4 billion.
- In July 2026, Barracuda Networks acquired EVO

== See also ==
- Comparison of file hosting services
- Comparison of file synchronization software
- Comparison of online backup services
