= Compatibility testing =

Compatibility testing is a part of non-functional testing conducted on application software to ensure the application's compatibility with different computing environment.

The ISO 25010 standard, (System and Software Quality Models) defines compatibility as a characteristic or degree to which a software system can exchange information with other systems whilst sharing the same software and hardware. The degree to which a product can perform its required functions efficiently while sharing a common environment and resources with other products, without detrimental impact on any other product is known as co-existence while interoperability is the degree to which two or more systems, products, or components can exchange information and use the information that has been exchanged. In these contexts, compatibility testing would be information gathering about a product or software system to determine the extent of coexistence and interoperability exhibited in the system under test.

== See also ==
- List of International Organization for Standardization standards, 24000-25999
- ISO/IEC 25010:2011 Systems and software engineering - Systems and software Quality Requirements and Evaluation (SQuaRE) - System and software quality models
