= Yosemite Server Backup =

Backup software

Yosemite Server Backup (YSB) was cross-platform backup software developed by Barracuda Networks, Inc. After acquiring Yosemite Technologies, Barracuda Networks released Yosemite Server Backup as the first offering in their Barracuda Ware line of products. YSB ran on 32- and 64-bit systems, and could back up to both hard disks and tapes. Yosemite Server Backup is no longer a stand alone package as of Sept. 30, 2017. It is now part of Barracuda Backup.
