= Eagle eye =

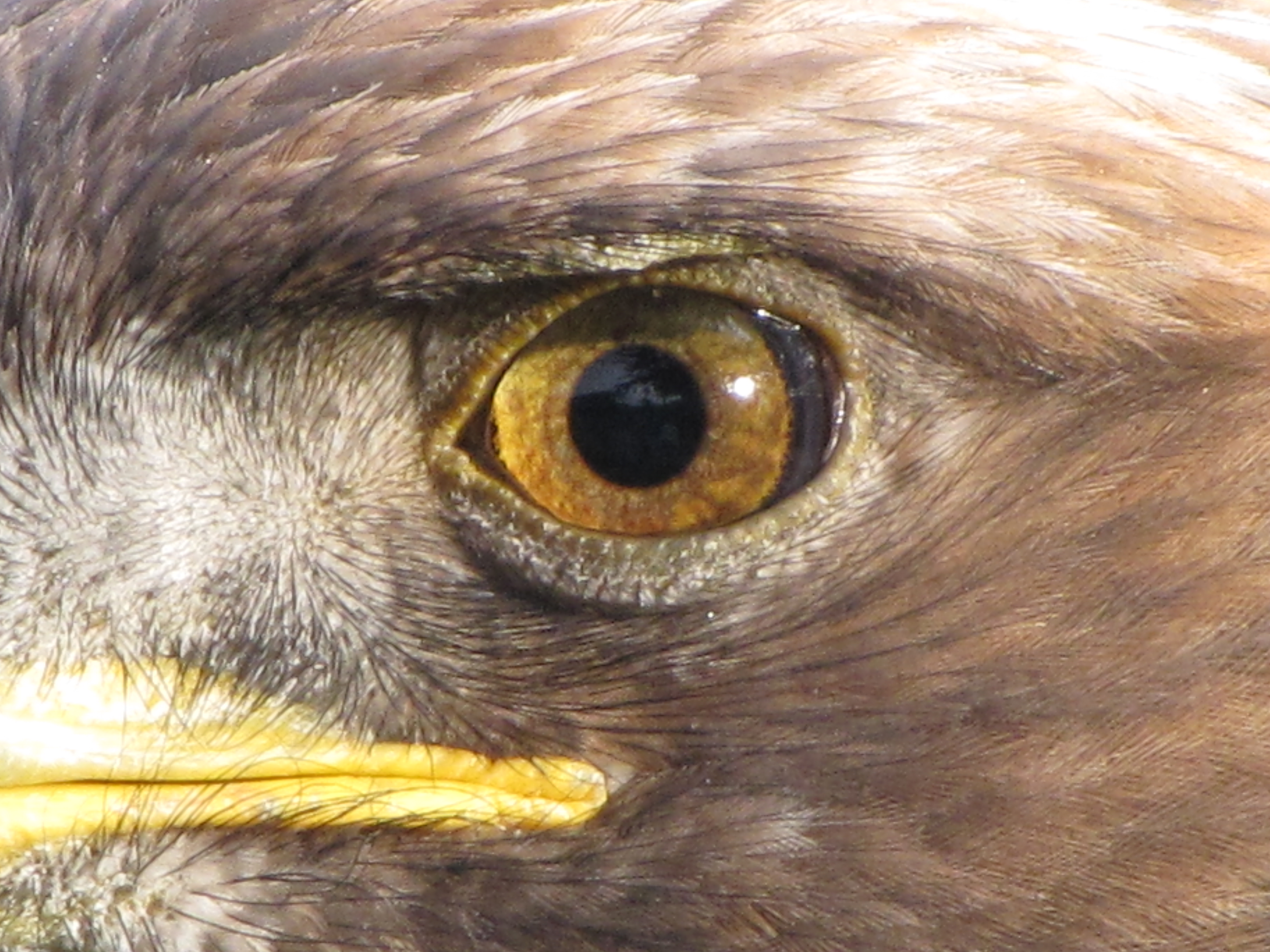
Eye of a golden eagle

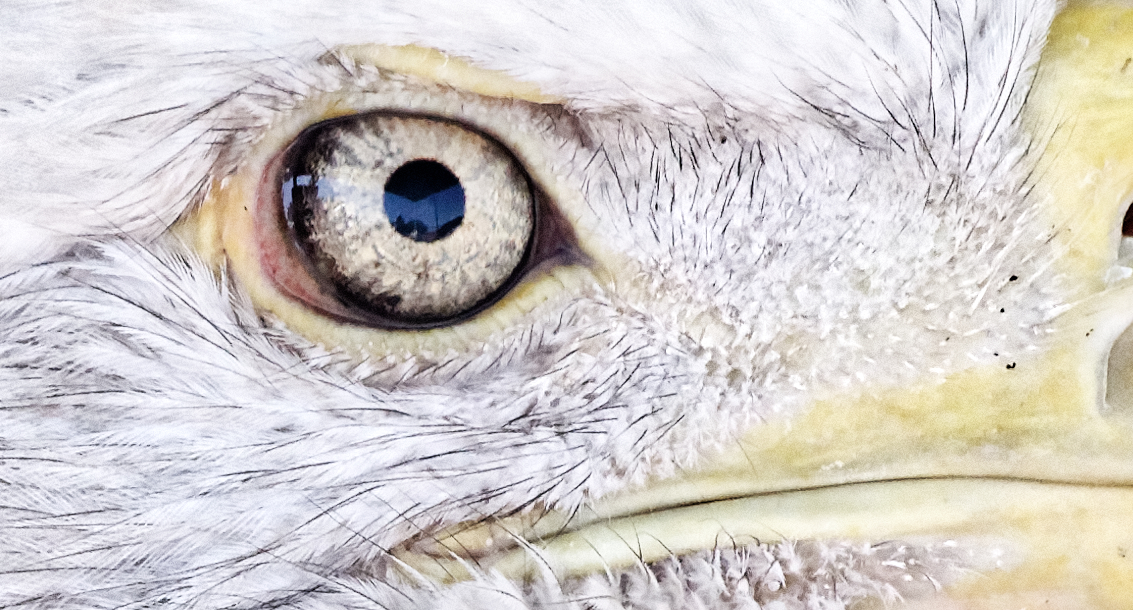
Eye of a bald eagle

The eagle eye is among the sharpest in the animal kingdom, with an eyesight estimated at 4 to 8 times stronger than that of the average human. Although an eagle may only weigh 4.5 kilograms (10 lb), its eyes are roughly the same size as those of a human. Eagle weight varies: a small eagle could weigh 700 grams (1.5 lb), while a larger one could weigh 6.5 kilograms (14 lb); an eagle of about 4.5 kilograms (9.9 lb) weight could have eyes as big as that of a human who weighs 91 kilograms (200 lb). Although the size of the eagle eye is about the same as that of a human being, the back side shape of the eagle eye is flatter. Their eyes are stated to be larger than their brain, by weight. Color vision with resolution and clarity are the most prominent features of eagles' eyes, hence sharp-sighted people are sometimes referred to as "eagle-eyed". Eagles can identify five distinctly colored squirrels and locate their prey even if hidden.

In addition to eagles, birds such as hawks, falcons, and owls also known as raptors have extraordinary vision which enable them to hunt for their prey more easily. Raptors are also known as "birds of prey" and are categorized by their predator hunting style. This means that they use their sharp senses to locate and capture prey. An eagle is said to be able to spot a rabbit 3.2 kilometres (2.0 mi) away. As the eagle descends from the sky to attack its prey, the muscles in the eyes continuously adjust the curvature of the eyeballs to maintain sharp focus and accurate perception throughout the approach and attack.

== Eye anatomy and physiology ==
The outer most region of the eye is the cornea; light passes through the cornea first. Light is then refracted when passed through the cornea given its curved convex shape. The image formed by the cornea is upside down and reversed from right to left. The layers of the cornea in raptors include: the anterior corneal epithelium, anterior limiting lamina (Bowman's layer), substantia propria (stroma comprising the majority of corneal thickness), posterior limiting lamina (Descemet's membrane) posterior epithelium (endothelium).

The iris in eagles functions similarly to the iris in humans, it contracts and dilates to control the amount of light received by the retina. Eagles have large transparent lenses that have the ability to change shape. The purpose of the lens being able to change shape is so eagles can quickly focus on an object with accuracy. The sclera is made of approximately 15 small bones which give the eye its shape and function to protect the inner structures of the eye. The ciliary muscles originate at the sclera and are located within the ciliary body. These muscles are striated and function to change the shape of the lens.

An eagle's retina allows for a higher Nyquist limit. Its retina is more pronounced with rod cells and cone cells. In the eagle, the retina's fovea has one million cells per mm^{2} as compared to 200,000 per mm^{2} in humans. Eagles have large eyes that take up half of their skull. A large portion of the eagle's skull is dedicated to sight because it is essential for their survival. Eagles eyes are flat and wide toward the back to maximize the image that is formed within the eye. At the back of the eye there's a layer of photoreceptor cells (rods and cones) called the retina that transmit visual information to the brain. Eagles have a deep central fovea and a shallow temporal fovea that function for better visual acuity and higher resolution of sight. "The line of sight of the deep fovea points forwards and approximately 45 degrees to the right or left of the head axis, while that of the shallow fovea also points forwards but approximately 15 degrees to the right or left of the head axis."

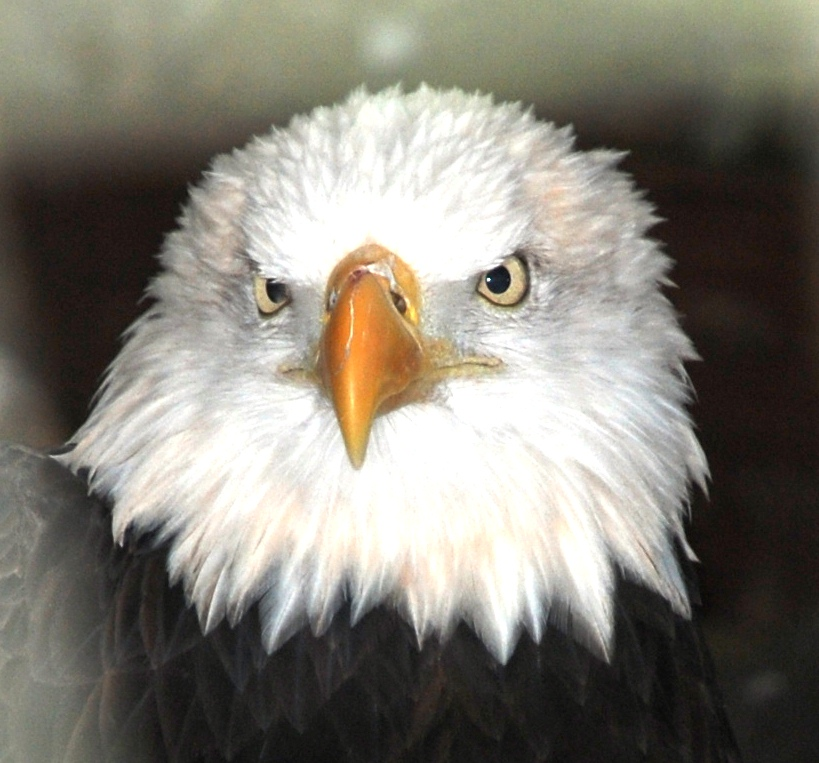
Bald eagle

Eagles have a highly developed sense of sight, which allows them to spot prey easily. Eagles have excellent 20/5 vision compared to an average human who only has 20/20 vision. This means eagles can see things from 20 feet (or 6 meters) away that we can only see from 5 feet (or 1,5 meters) away. Beginning with their cranial structure, eagles have fixed eye sockets that are "angled 30 degrees from the midline of their face." Giving eagles a "340-degree visual field" that allows for both excellent peripheral and binocular vision. An eagle in flight can reputedly sight a rabbit 3.2 kilometres (2.0 mi) away. Talon–eye coordination is a hunting imperative. From its perch at the top of trees, the eagle can dive at speeds of 201–322 kilometres per hour (125–200 mph) to catch its prey by its talons. The phenomenon of an eagle turning its flexible head almost 270 degrees, while sitting or flying, is attributed to the fact that when its large head is turned fully its eyes are also turned, unlike a human. Eagles, in their young age, cannot locate fish below water due to refraction error of the eye, so they compensate by grabbing dead fish floating on the surface. As they grow older, the refraction error naturally rectifies itself and they can spot fish below the surface. The fierce look of the eagle is due to the placement of a bony ridge above its eyes, the small amount of bare skin between its eyes, and its sharp beak. The feathers on its body generally do not grow over the eyes. The ridge protects the eyes from protruding tree branches when it perches on trees and also from prey that struggles to escape. Each eagle eyeball moves separately. The eyeball is so large and so tightly fit that the eagle can barely turn it within the socket called an orbit. The eyes are located in front of its head with face forward and looking slightly askew is an advantage. Like many predators, eagle eyes both face forward and have overlapping fields of view. This allows for binocular vision with stereopsis that vastly improves depth perception. Though its hearing does not match its visual acuity, mating calls are said to be heard for several miles.

Eagles have upper and lower eyelids, the bottom lid is more mobile and gives the appearance of the eyelid blinking from bottom to top. Inside the eyelids are made up of connective tissue called fibroelastic plate (tarsus) that function to support the outer eyelid and give it shape. On the eyelids are small hair like feathers called filo-plumes that are comparable to human eyelashes. Eagles have a third eyelid also known as a nictitating membrane, which "grows in the inner corner of the eye, next to the tear duct". Eagle tears "produced by the lacrimal gland and Hardarian gland" moisten the eyes and contain the chemical lysozyme which protects against salt water and also destroys bacteria, thus preventing eye infections. The nictitating membrane is a thin semi-transparent piece of skin that acts a sweeping wiper moving laterally across the eye controlled by the quadratus muscle. The third eyelid also acts as a mechanism to remove "dust and dirt from the cornea". The eagle iris is a pale yellow color, much lighter than human eyes. Both eagles and humans have a white area called the sclera, but in the case of eagles, it is hidden below the eyelid. Eyelid openings are oval-shaped in humans, while they are round in the case of birds' eyes.

Most eagles have excellent vision. Generally, eagles do not suffer from myopia (nearsightedness) and hyperopia (farsightedness); those who have these defects cannot hunt easily and eventually starve to death. Eagles have the unique feature of the pecten. Its function is not clearly understood, but the general belief is that it helps to nourish the retina, keeps it healthy without blood vessels, facilitates the fluids to flow through the vitreous body at an appropriate pressure, absorbs light to minimize any reflections inside the eye that could impair vision, helps perceive motion, creates a protective shade from the sun, and senses magnetic fields.

== Eagle Species ==
Wood (1917), The Fundus Oculi of Birds, Especially as Viewed by the Ophthalmoscope: A Study in Comparative Anatomy and Physiology, describes eagle eye anatomy in detail:

- "Bald eagle (Haliaeetus leucocephalus). The most commonly known eagle that originates from North America is the Bald eagle because it's the national bird of the United States. Despite the name bald eagles are not hairless, their head is covered in white feathers contrasting with their dark brown body and white tail. The prevailing color of this bird's fundus is dark reddish-brown, the lower half changing to a dull orange-red. The whole eyeground is covered with choroidal capillaries, and dotted over with brown pigment grains, giving it a rough, granular appearance. A gray sheen pervades the upper part of the fundus. On the temporal side and some distance from the upper end of the optic nerve is a brilliant, white, round dot surrounded by a small, light-green reflex ring, which is itself enclosed in a very brilliant, narrow green ring—the muscular region. On the nasal side of the disc, and on a level with this macula is another area, of a gray color, surrounded by a fan-shaped, luminous reflex. The optic nerve-entrance is distinctly white, and along its center is strewn a large number of minute pigment dots. The outer margin of the disc is bordered with black pigment, as if a shadow were cast upon it by the pecten. In this regard and in some others, this fundus resembles the eyeground of the sea eagle."

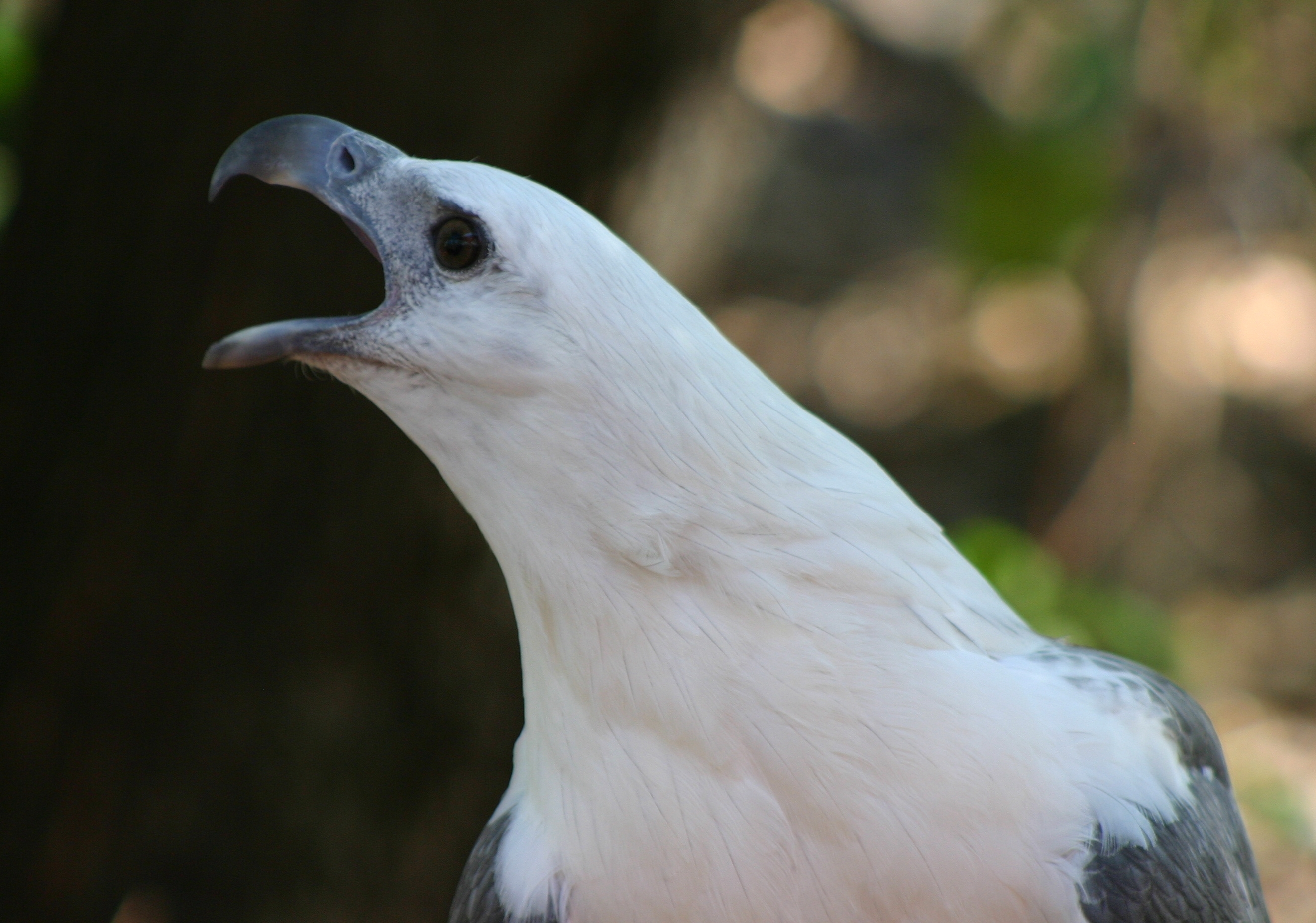
White-bellied sea eagle

- "White-bellied sea eagle (Haliaeetus leucogaster). The coloration of the eyeground is mostly dull-brown, the lower quadrants of the field being covered with dull, orange-red capillaries evidently choroidal. The optic disc is a long white oval, whose center is tinted with orange and covered with tiny pigment dots. The papillary margins are white bordered with black pigment. The upper half of the fundus is covered by a mass of dull gray dots. There is a well defined reflex near both maculae, each similar in position to that seen in the kestrel. These areas are evidently very sensitive to light, as the bird becomes very fidgety and irritable when the reflected rays from the mirror are thrown directly on one or other fovea. The pecten is very large and comes well forward towards the posterior surface of the lens. Both extremities of the organ are clearly visible through the ophthalmoscope. There are very opaque nerve fibers to be seen in any part of the eyeground."
