= Deloitte Technology Fast 500 =

List of fastest growing tech companies

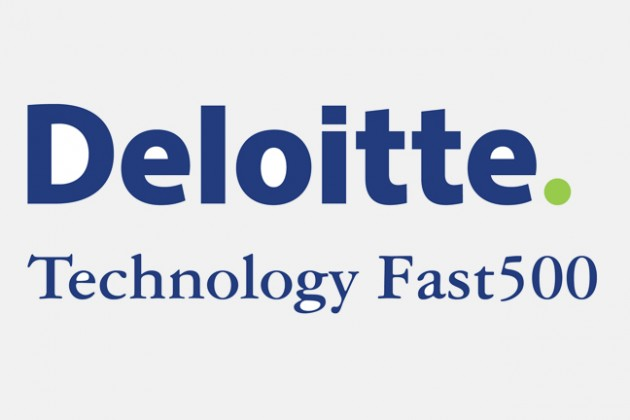
Deloitte Fast 500 logo

The Deloitte Technology Fast 500 Awards are organized and overseen by the global professional services firm Deloitte Touche Tohmatsu Limited. These awards recognize the 500 technology companies with the highest growth rates across various regions worldwide. Recipients encompass both publicly traded and privately held companies.

The awards were established in 1997 amid the dotcom boom to showcase the achievements of burgeoning U.S. technology firms. Over time, the Fast 500 initiative has broadened its scope to encompass North America, Asia Pacific, and Europe, the Middle East, and Africa (EMEA).

The Fast 500 examines companies' relative growth in revenue over a three-year period. A company that grows by $1 million from a revenue of $2 million would be ranked below a company that grows by $500,000 from a revenue of $100,000. The Fast 500 recognizes companies that have shown significant growth, effective strategies, and strong management. It has three main international divisions:

- Fast 500 Asia Pacific
- Fast 500 EMEA
- Fast 500 North America

== Fast 500 EMEA ==
=== 2014 Winners ===
For 2014, France remained the most represented country, marking the 4th consecutive year. The United Kingdom trailed France, followed by Sweden. Israeli companies comprised five of the top ten companies on the list. The software sector represented 42% of the overall rankings on this year's EMEA Fast 500, followed by the Internet sector with 21%. Rounding out the sector list was Telecommunications/Networking (13%), Semiconductors/Components/Electronics (7%), Biotech/Pharmaceutical/Medical Equipment (7%), Greentech (5%), Media/Entertainment (3%), and Computers/Peripherals (2%). A full listing of the 2014 Deloitte Technology Fast 500 Europe, Middle East & Africa (EMEA) winners can be found online.

=== 2013 Winners ===
The Technology Fast 500 EMEA Winners 2013 had an overall average revenue growth rate of 1,403%, a slight decrease from the 1,549% growth rate for 2012. Leading the list, the software sector represented 43% of the overall rankings on this year's EMEA Fast 500, followed by the Internet sector with 22%. A full listing of the 2013 Deloitte Technology Fast 500 Europe, Middle East & Africa (EMEA) winners can be found here.

=== 2016 Winners ===
The 2016 Deloitte Technology Fast 500 list highlights the fastest-growing technology firms in North America, based on fiscal-year revenue growth from 2012 to 2015. Leading the rankings was Loot Crate, which achieved a staggering 66,661 % growth, followed by Yieldbot (39,783 %) and Ariad Pharmaceuticals (21,191 %). Across the region, total growth spanned from 121 % to 66,661 %, with a median increase of 290 %, underscoring the rapid expansion of emerging tech firms.

== Deloitte Technology Fast 50 ==
The Deloitte Technology Fast 50 Awards, created in 1995, form a subset of the Fast 500 and represent an inner circle of winners. The Fast 50 award is made at the regional or country level in a number of geographies around the world. The Deloitte Technology Fast 50 program ranks fast growing technology companies, public or private, based on their percentage revenue growth over three years.
