= Holland Christian High School =

Private, Calvinist high school in Holland, Michigan, United States

Location
- 950 Ottawa Avenue; Holland, Michigan 49423; United States; 42°45′46″N 86°07′40″W

Information
- School type: Private/Parochial
- Religious affiliation: Christian Reformed Church in North America
- Founded: 1902
- Status: Open
- Principal: Miles Colago
- Chaplain: Bryant Russ
- Teaching staff: 56.0 (on an FTE basis)
- Grades: 9–12
- Student to teacher ratio: 13.2
- Hours in school day: 7
- Campus: Small city
- Colors: Maroon & White
- Athletics conference: Ottawa-Kent Conference Blue Division
- Mascot: Maroon
- Nickname: Maroons
- Publication: Scripta
- Newspaper: Echo
- Yearbook: Footprints
- Tuition: US$9,926
- Website: School website

Holland Christian High School is a private, Calvinist high school in the city of Holland, Michigan. Holland Christian's colors are maroon and white, and their nickname is "The Maroons". Holland Christian High School is the only grade 9–12 building in the Holland Christian Schools system.

== History ==
By 1963 the school had 264 students in the tenth grade, 289 in the 12th grade, and other grades ranging 173-200 students. Prior to 1965 Zeeland Christian School only had up to junior high school and referred high school students to Holland Christian High. The Zeeland Christian School high school was scheduled to open in 1965 but never happened.

== Campus ==
In 1963 the library used blond wood furniture and included decorations.

== Athletics ==
The school uses Holland Civic Center for its basketball matches. The Holland Evening Sentinel, in 1963, stated that the school's athletic facilities were inadequate.

The men's swimming and diving team won the 1988 and 1989 Class B state championship meets, and the 2018 and 2019 Division Three state championship meets.

The men's varsity soccer team, won the 2022 Division Three Michigan state championship. Holland Christian won two other soccer state championships in 1986 and 2003.

== Notable alumni ==
- Kathy Arendsen, softball player and coach
- Jeff Bates, co-founder of Slashdot
- Kirk Cousins, quarterback for the Minnesota Vikings
- Klaas de Boer, former professional soccer player and coach
- Betsy DeVos, former United States Secretary of Education
- Anthony Diekema, former president of Calvin College
- William Garvelink, former U.S. ambassador to the Democratic Republic of the Congo
- Tony Gugino, professional basketball player
- Dave Hertel, former professional soccer player
- Roger W. Heyns, former chancellor of the University of California, Berkeley (class of 1935)
- Pete Hoekstra, U.S. ambassador to Canada; former U.S. representative and U.S. ambassador to the Netherlands
- Bill Huizenga, U.S. representative for Michigan's 4th congressional district
- Paul Ronald Lambers, U.S. Army soldier and Medal of Honor recipient
- Rob Malda, computer programmer and co-founder of Slashdot
- Erik Prince, businessman and founder of Blackwater
- Rachel Reenstra, television host and actress
