= Holland, Michigan =

City in Michigan, United States

- City
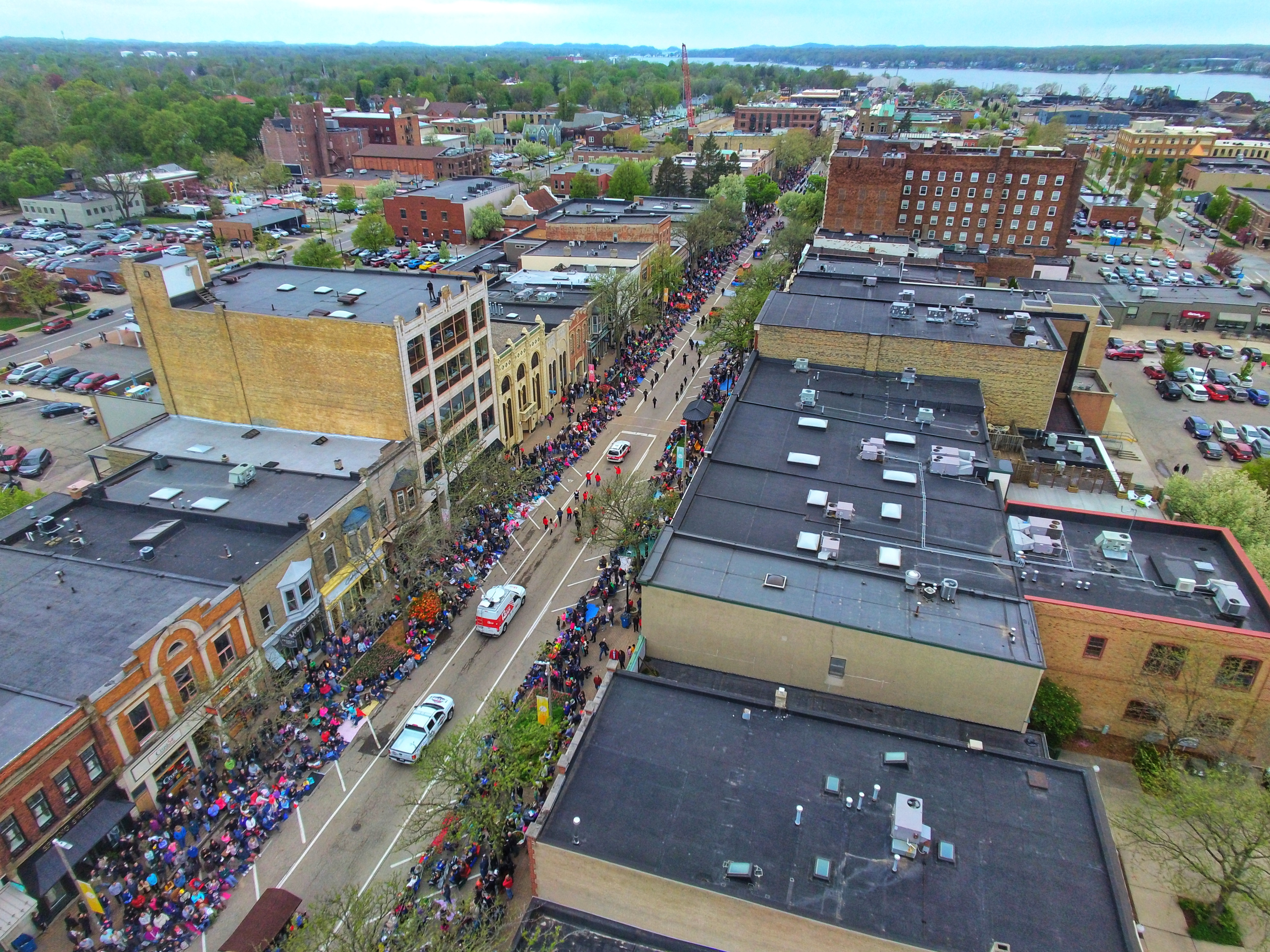
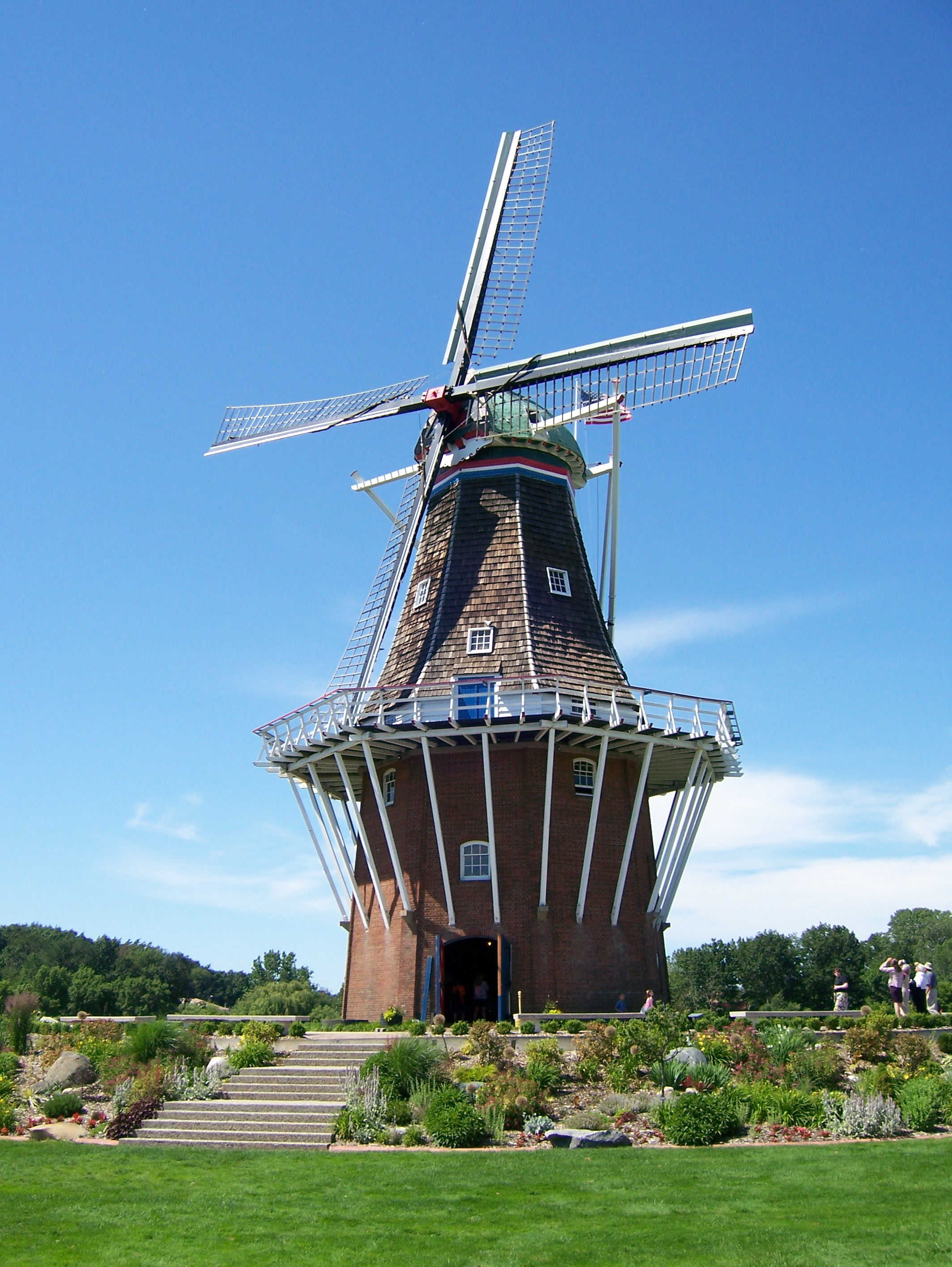
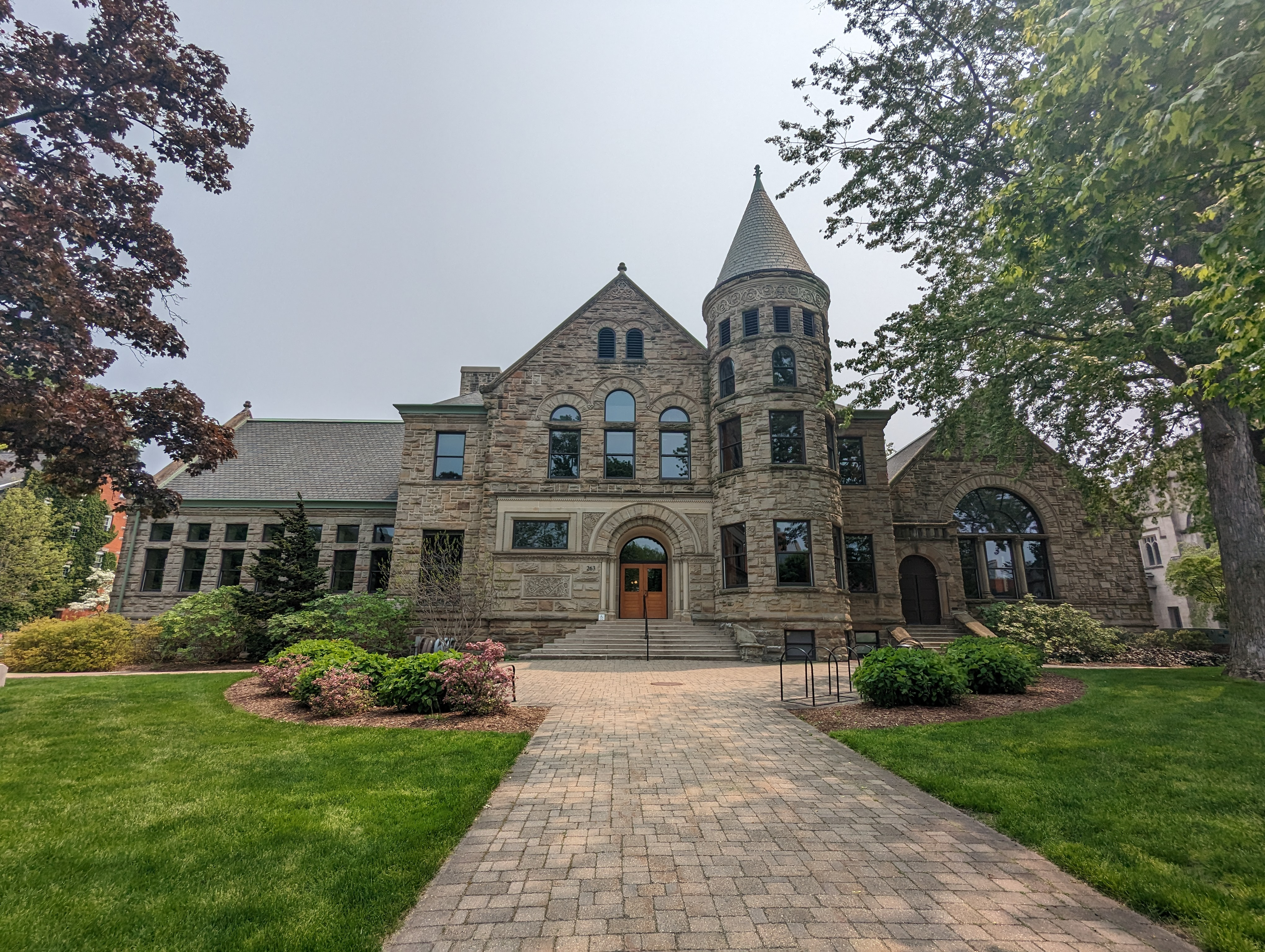
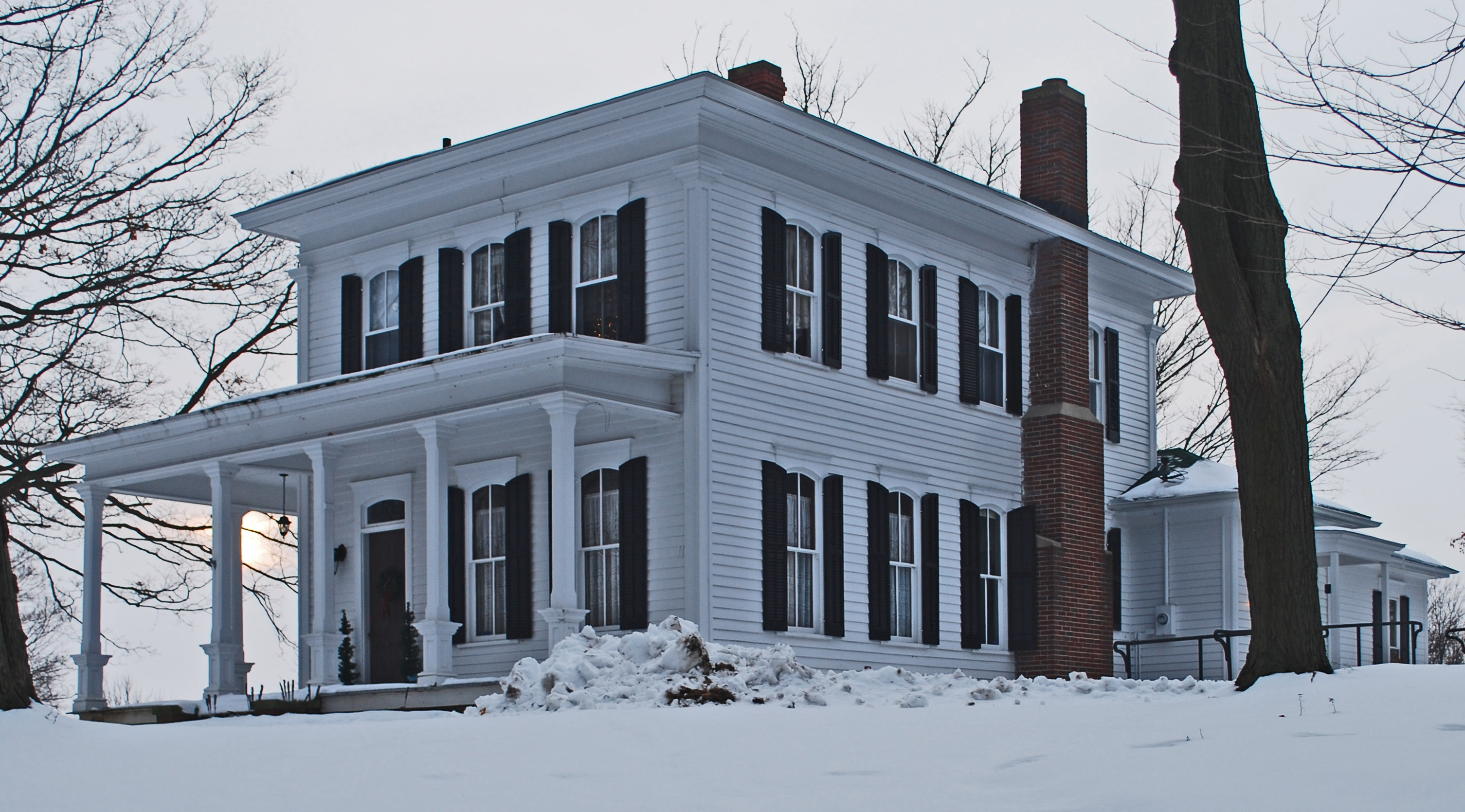
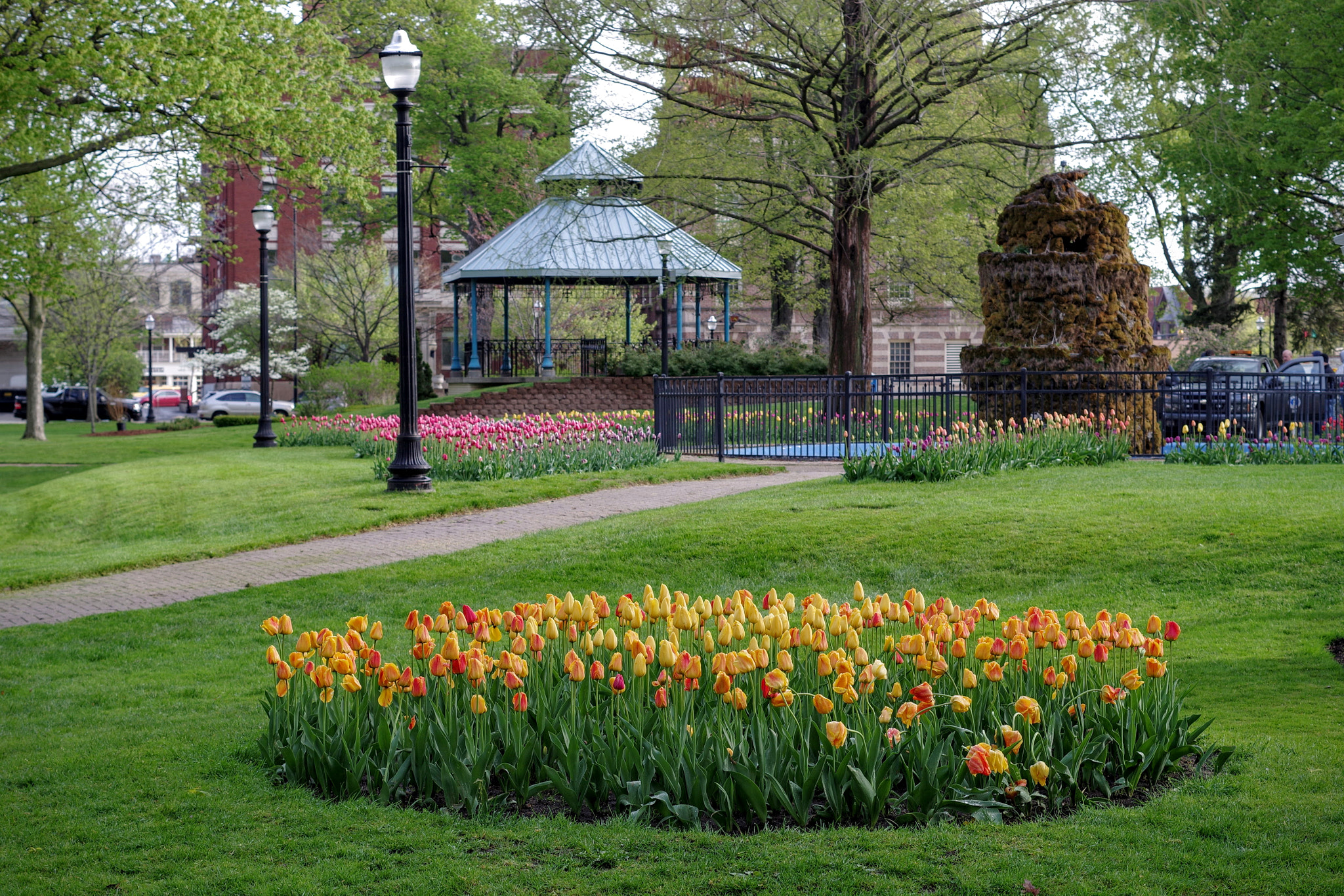
- Downtown Holland during the Tulip Time Festival De Zwaan Hope College Benjamin Van Raalte House Centennial Park

- Flag Seal
- Nickname: The Tulip City
- Interactive map of Holland, Michigan
- Location within Michigan Location within the United States
- Coordinates: 42°47′15″N 86°06′32″W
- Country: United States
- State: Michigan
- Counties: Allegan and Ottawa
- Settled: 1847
- Incorporated: 1867

Government
  - Mayor: Nathan Bocks
  - Clerk: Brenda Katerberg
  - City council: Members: Tim Vreeman; Lyn Raymond; Bylnda Sól; Kim Rowan; Scott Corbin; Devin Shea

Area
  - Total: 17.45 sq mi (45.20 km^{2})
  - Land: 16.68 sq mi (43.21 km^{2})
  - Water: 0.77 sq mi (1.99 km^{2})
- Elevation: 610 ft (186 m)

Population (2020)
  - Total: 34,378
  - Estimate (2025): 35,372
  - Density: 2,070.74/sq mi (799.52/km^{2})
- Time zone: UTC−5 (Eastern (EST))
  - Summer (DST): UTC−4 (EDT)
- ZIP code(s): 49422–49424
- Area code: 616
- FIPS code: 26-38640
- GNIS feature ID: 0628421
- Website: Official website

Holland is a city in Ottawa and Allegan counties in the U.S. state of Michigan. Located in the western region of the Lower Peninsula, the city is situated near the eastern shore of Lake Michigan on Lake Macatawa, which is fed by the Macatawa River. As of the 2020 census, the population was 34,378, with an urbanized area population of 107,034. Holland's ZIP codes extend into parts of surrounding townships in Ottawa and Allegan counties.

Holland was founded by Dutch Americans and is in an area that has a large percentage of citizens of Dutch American heritage. It is home to Hope College and Western Theological Seminary, institutions of the Reformed Church in America. Holland's economy includes manufacturing, agriculture, tourism, and higher education. It is home to a number of prominent companies, including Herman Miller, Haworth, and Adient. The city also attracts thousands of visitors each year for its annual Tulip Time Festival, which celebrates the area's Dutch heritage and tulip fields.

The city spans the Ottawa/Allegan county line, with 9.08 sq mi (23.52 km^{2}) in Ottawa and the remaining 8.13 sq mi (21.06 km^{2}) in Allegan. Holland is the largest city in both Ottawa and Allegan counties. The Ottawa County portion is part of the Grand Rapids metropolitan area, while the Allegan County portion anchors the Holland micropolitan statistical area, which is coextensive with Allegan County. The city is part of the larger Grand Rapids–Wyoming combined statistical area.

== History ==
Ottawa County was originally populated by Ottawa Indians. In 1846, Reverend George Smith established the Old Wing Mission as an outreach to the native population. The Ottawa living here were primarily practicing Catholics, but Smith tried converting them to Protestantism. While generally unsuccessful in converting the Native population, the two groups worked together relatively closely for a short time. This attempt to work and live together was not valued by the next group who arrived.

Holland was settled in 1847 by Dutch Calvinist separatists, under the leadership of Dr. Albertus van Raalte. Dire economic conditions in the Netherlands compelled them to emigrate.

Van Raalte and his colony settled on land in the midst of the Ottawa (Odawa) people's Old Wing Mission Colony near the Macatawa River (also known as the Black River) where it streams into Lake Macatawa (Called Black Lake prior to June 4, 1935) which, in turn, leads to Lake Michigan via a channel. The Dutch settlers and the Ottawa people never got along. Dutch settlers began stealing sugar and venison from the Ottawa. The Dutch were unwilling to accept the Ottawa people's mix of Catholic and Native culture. Soon, Dutch leaders tried to force the natives into wooded land in Allegan County. Eventually, the natives moved north to preserve their way of life and culture. Chief Peter Waukazoo and Reverend George Smith decided to move the community and the Ottawa Mission from Holland up to Northport (on the Leelanau Peninsula), voyaging on boats and canoes.

In Holland's early history, Van Raalte was a spiritual leader, as well as overseeing political, educational and financial matters. In 1847, Van Raalte established a congregation of the Reformed Church in America, which would later be called the First Reformed Church of Holland. On March 25, 1867, Holland was incorporated as a city with Isaac Cappon being the city's first mayor.

=== October 1871 Fire ===
The city suffered a major fire on October 8–10, 1871, at the same time as the Great Chicago Fire in Illinois and the very deadly Peshtigo Fire in Wisconsin. Due to the Great Michigan Fire (which included the Port Huron Fire of 1871), Manistee and Port Huron, Michigan, also burned at the same time. Also known as the Great Midwest fires, the series of fires across Michigan claimed approximately 500 lives, though the exact death toll remains unknown. The vast majority of downtown burned in the fire, claiming 1 life in the aftermath of the fire. The exact cause of the fire remains unknown. There are a number of theories about what caused the fire. The congruence with the Chicago fire has led to some claims of a link, such as embers floating over Lake Michigan to start the Holland Fire. However, one of the theories is rather fantastical and hence fairly unlikely: that burning methane gas from a passing comet led to the fires. The most likely explanation remains that strong winds strengthened a small brush fire, first igniting the nearby forests before burning the town itself. However, no definitive explanation for the fires have ever been given, and the exact cause remains unknown.

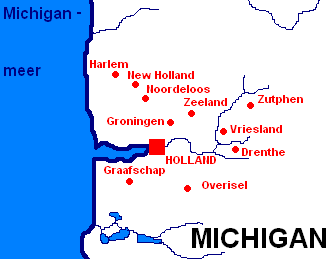
Dutch settlements in Michigan

== Geography ==
Holland is located at 42.7875235, -86.1089301.

According to the United States Census Bureau, the city has a total area of 17.450 sq mi (45.20 km^{2}), of which, 16.683 sq mi (43.21 km^{2}) is land and 0.767 sq mi (1.99 km^{2}) is water.

Holland is divided between southwestern Ottawa and northwestern Allegan counties, with 32nd Street forming the county line. Of the city's total area, 9.08 sq mi (23.52 km^{2}) are in Ottawa County, and the remaining 8.13 sq mi (21.06 km^{2}) in Allegan County. The nearby city of Zeeland is located about 5 miles (8.0 km) from downtown Holland. The county seat of Ottawa County, Grand Haven, is located about 20 miles (32 km) north-northwest of downtown Holland, while the county seat of Allegan County, the city of Allegan, is located about 22 miles (35 km) southeast of downtown Holland.

The city is located adjacent to (south of) the Macatawa River and Lake Macatawa, both of which flow westerly into Lake Michigan. The downtown core of Holland is roughly 5.25 miles (8.45 km) east of Lake Michigan.

=== Neighborhoods ===
- Holland Heights
- Westside
- Washington Square
- Historic District
- Hope
- Rosa Parks
- Maplewood
- South End
- Downtown

=== Climate ===
Holland has a Midwestern humid continental climate (Köppen Dfb/Dfa) that is influenced by the Great Lakes, and is part of USDA Hardiness zone 6b.

Climate data for Holland, Michigan (West Michigan Regional Airport) 1991–2020 normals, extremes 1905–present
Month	Jan	Feb	Mar	Apr	May	Jun	Jul	Aug	Sep	Oct	Nov	Dec	Year
Record high °F (°C)	67 (19)	70 (21)	85 (29)	90 (32)	95 (35)	101 (38)	102 (39)	101 (38)	99 (37)	89 (32)	78 (26)	70 (21)	102 (39)
Mean maximum °F (°C)	52.6 (11.4)	53.7 (12.1)	68.6 (20.3)	79.0 (26.1)	85.8 (29.9)	91.3 (32.9)	92.5 (33.6)	90.5 (32.5)	88.3 (31.3)	79.5 (26.4)	65.5 (18.6)	55.4 (13.0)	94.1 (34.5)
Mean daily maximum °F (°C)	31.8 (−0.1)	34.3 (1.3)	44.4 (6.9)	56.8 (13.8)	68.6 (20.3)	78.1 (25.6)	81.7 (27.6)	80.2 (26.8)	73.5 (23.1)	60.8 (16.0)	47.6 (8.7)	36.9 (2.7)	57.9 (14.4)
Daily mean °F (°C)	25.9 (−3.4)	27.4 (−2.6)	36.0 (2.2)	47.1 (8.4)	58.3 (14.6)	67.9 (19.9)	71.6 (22.0)	70.0 (21.1)	62.9 (17.2)	51.7 (10.9)	40.7 (4.8)	31.5 (−0.3)	49.3 (9.6)
Mean daily minimum °F (°C)	19.9 (−6.7)	20.5 (−6.4)	27.6 (−2.4)	37.4 (3.0)	47.9 (8.8)	57.7 (14.3)	61.6 (16.4)	59.9 (15.5)	52.4 (11.3)	42.6 (5.9)	33.8 (1.0)	26.2 (−3.2)	40.6 (4.8)
Mean minimum °F (°C)	0.1 (−17.7)	2.8 (−16.2)	9.4 (−12.6)	23.5 (−4.7)	33.8 (1.0)	42.9 (6.1)	49.6 (9.8)	48.2 (9.0)	38.3 (3.5)	29.4 (−1.4)	21.0 (−6.1)	9.6 (−12.4)	−3.7 (−19.8)
Record low °F (°C)	−21 (−29)	−24 (−31)	−9 (−23)	5 (−15)	20 (−7)	29 (−2)	40 (4)	36 (2)	27 (−3)	19 (−7)	−13 (−25)	−17 (−27)	−24 (−31)
Average precipitation inches (mm)	1.87 (47)	1.77 (45)	2.07 (53)	3.50 (89)	3.76 (96)	3.45 (88)	2.80 (71)	3.06 (78)	2.95 (75)	4.22 (107)	3.20 (81)	2.11 (54)	34.76 (883)
Average precipitation days (≥ 0.01 in)	14.0	12.9	10.5	12.7	12.8	11.0	9.9	10.9	11.1	14.1	12.6	13.8	146.3
Source: NOAA

== Demographics ==
Historical population
Census	Pop.	Note	%±
1870	2,319		—
1880	2,620		13.0%
1890	3,945		50.6%
1900	7,790		97.5%
1910	10,490		34.7%
1920	12,183		16.1%
1930	14,346		17.8%
1940	14,616		1.9%
1950	15,858		8.5%
1960	24,777		56.2%
1970	26,337		6.3%
1980	26,281		−0.2%
1990	30,745		17.0%
2000	35,048		14.0%
2010	33,051		−5.7%
2020	34,378		4.0%
2025 (est.)	35,372		2.9%
U.S. Decennial Census; 2020 Census

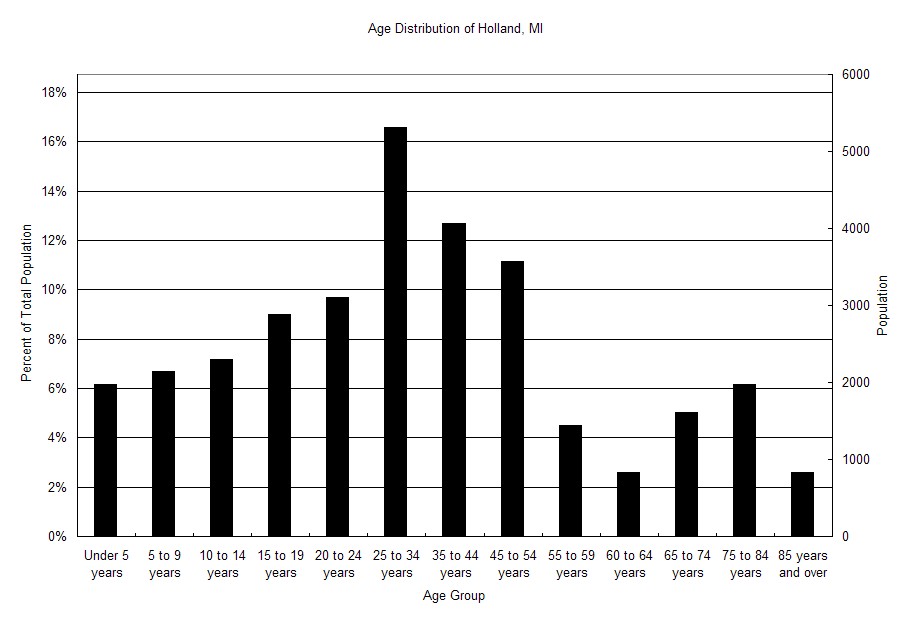
A graph showing the age distribution of Holland

=== Racial and ethnic composition ===
Holland city, Michigan – Racial and ethnic composition Note: the US Census treats Hispanic/Latino as an ethnic category. This table excludes Latinos from the racial categories and assigns them to a separate category. Hispanics/Latinos may be of any race.
Race / Ethnicity (NH = Non-Hispanic)	Pop 2000	Pop 2010	Pop 2020	% 2000	% 2010	% 2020
White alone (NH)	24,543	22,778	22,641	70.03%	68.92%	65.86%
Black or African American alone (NH)	819	1,068	1,279	2.34%	3.23%	3.72%
Native American or Alaska Native alone (NH)	112	94	76	0.32%	0.28%	0.22%
Asian alone (NH)	1,236	944	913	3.53%	2.86%	2.66%
Native Hawaiian or Pacific Islander alone (NH)	6	29	30	0.02%	0.09%	0.09%
Other race alone (NH)	39	34	106	0.11%	0.10%	0.31%
Mixed race or Multiracial (NH)	510	592	1,291	1.46%	1.79%	3.76%
Hispanic or Latino (any race)	7,783	7,512	8,042	22.21%	22.73%	23.39%
Total	35,048	33,051	34,378	100.00%	100.00%	100.00%

=== 2020 census ===
As of the 2020 census, Holland had a population of 34,378. Of that, 26,648 (77.5%) lived in Ottawa County, and 7,730 (22.5%) lived in Allegan County. The population density of the entire city was 2,060.7/sq mi (795.6/km^{2}). The median age was 34.5 years. 21.6% of residents were under the age of 18, including 5.1% under age 5, and 17.2% of residents were 65 years of age or older. For every 100 females there were 89.8 males, and for every 100 females age 18 and over there were 86.4 males age 18 and over.

99.9% of residents lived in urban areas, while 0.1% lived in rural areas.

There were 12,747 households and 7,880 families in the city. Of all households, 28.7% had children under the age of 18 living in them. 45.0% were married-couple households, 18.0% were households with a male householder and no spouse or partner present, and 30.6% were households with a female householder and no spouse or partner present. About 31.4% of all households were made up of individuals and 14.4% had someone living alone who was 65 years of age or older.

There were 13,512 housing units, of which 5.7% were vacant. The homeowner vacancy rate was 1.0% and the rental vacancy rate was 4.6%.

Racial composition as of the 2020 census
Race	Number	Percent
White	24,491	71.2%
Black or African American	1,442	4.2%
American Indian and Alaska Native	274	0.8%
Asian	958	2.8%
Native Hawaiian and Other Pacific Islander	30	0.1%
Some other race	3,228	9.4%
Two or more races	3,955	11.5%

=== 2010 census ===
As of the 2010 census, there were 33,051 people, 12,021 households, and 7,593 families residing in the city. The population density was 1,992.3/sq mi (769.2/km^{2}). There were 13,212 housing units at an average density of 796.4/sq mi (307.5/km^{2}).

The racial makeup of the city was 80.0% White alone, 3.6% Black or African American, 0.6% Native American, 3.0% Asian, 0.1% Pacific Islander, 9.2% from some other races and 3.4% from two or more races. Hispanic or Latino people of any race were 22.7% of the population.

There were 12,021 households, of which 32.8% had children under the age of 18 living with them, 46.5% were married couples living together, 11.9% had a female householder with no husband present, 4.7% had a male householder with no wife present, and 36.8% were non-families. 29.8% of all households were made up of individuals, and 13.5% had someone living alone who was 65 years of age or older. The average household size was 2.52 and the average family size was 3.13.

The median age in the city was 31.7 years. 24% of residents were under the age of 18; 16.5% were between the ages of 18 and 24; 24.7% were from 25 to 44; 21% were from 45 to 64; and 13.7% were 65 years of age or older. The gender makeup of the city was 47.5% male and 52.5% female.

== Economy ==
Holland is home to the world's largest pickle factory. The H.J. Heinz Company opened the factory at the same location in 1897, and processes over 1 million lbs. of pickles per day during the green season.

- Adient – automotive seating
- Haworth – office furniture
- Herman Miller – home and office furniture
- Johnson Controls – lithium-ion batteries
- LG Chem – lithium-ion batteries
- Tiara Yachts – luxury yachts/wind turbines
- Kraft Heinz – pickles, sauces, mustards
- Magna – engineered glass and mirrors
- Boxed Water is Better – a packaged water beverage

== Arts and culture ==
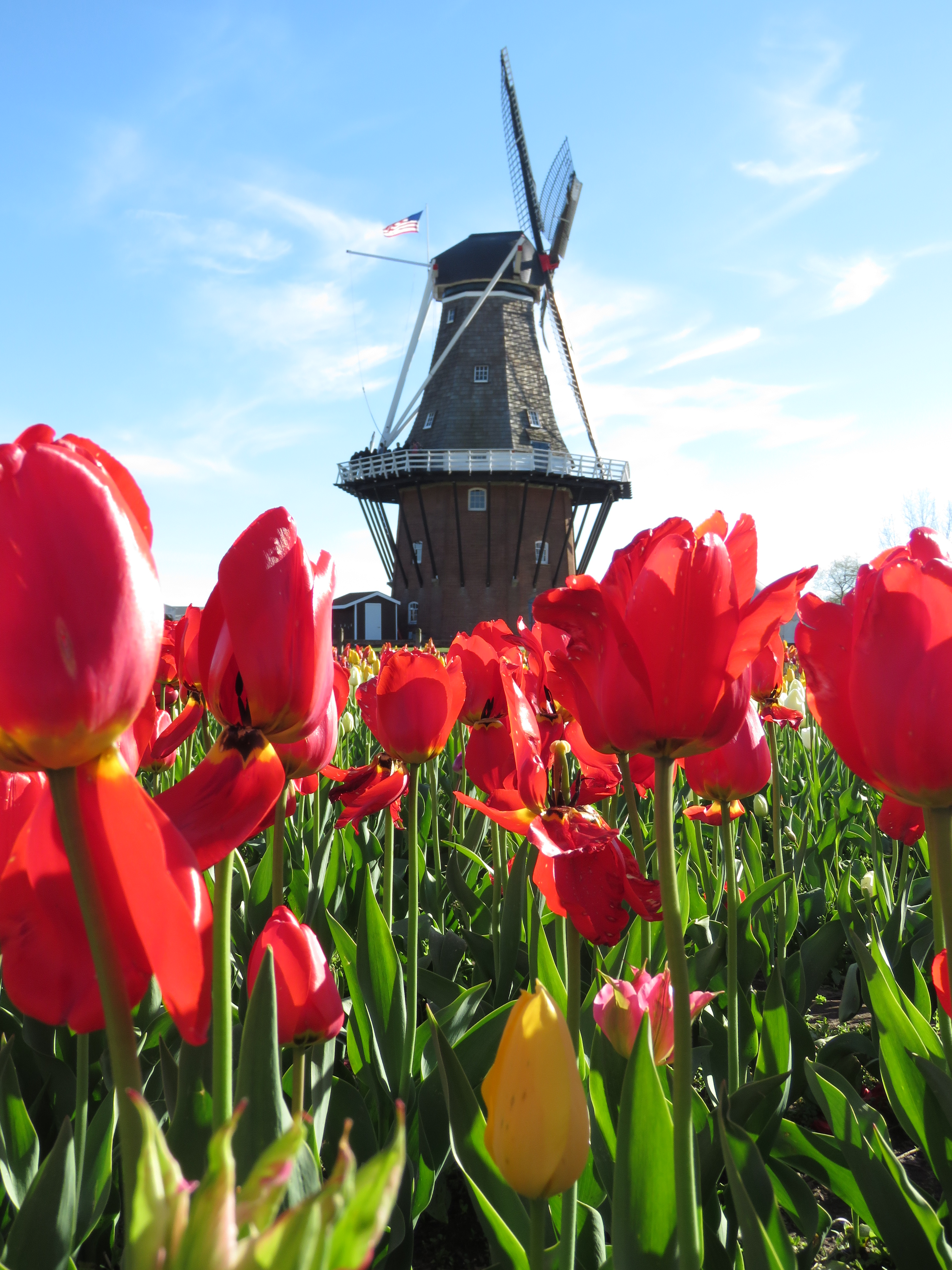
De Zwaan is located on Windmill Island.

Holland's Dutch-American heritage is reflected in a number of its cultural institutions and landmarks. Windmill Island Gardens contains De Zwaan, a Dutch windmill that was relocated from the Netherlands to Holland in 1964; Windmill Island opened to the public the following year. De Zwaan was listed on the National Register of Historic Places in 2018.

The Holland Museum presents exhibits on the history of Holland and collections of Dutch art and artifacts. The museum also operates two historic houses. The Cappon House, built in 1874, was the home of Holland's first mayor, Isaac Cappon. The Settlers House was built around 1867, survived the Holland fire of 1871, and has been restored to represent a working-class household of that period.

The Holland Downtown Historic District, centered primarily on Eighth Street and River Avenue, was added to the National Register of Historic Places in 1990. Downtown Holland also uses a municipal snowmelt system in which heated water is circulated through pipes beneath streets and sidewalks to melt snow and ice.

Latin Americans United for Progress organizes an annual Fiesta in Holland featuring music, food, dance and other events celebrating Latino culture.

Holland is also associated with the popularization of the "What Would Jesus Do?" bracelets. In 1989, Janie Tinklenberg, then a youth leader at Calvary Reformed Church in Holland, developed the bracelets as a reminder for members of her youth group; they subsequently became widely distributed Christian merchandise.

=== Tourism ===
Holland hosts the annual Tulip Time Festival in May. The festival originated after Holland High School biology teacher Lida Rogers proposed in 1927 that tulips be used as a civic beautification project and as a recognition of the city's Dutch heritage. The city purchased 100,000 tulip bulbs from the Netherlands in 1928, and the first Tulip Time celebration was held when they bloomed in 1929. Festival activities include tulip displays, parades and Dutch cultural performances. Attendance varies by year; festival organizers reported 895,153 visitors during the May 1–10, 2026 festival.

Near the city, Holland State Park has separate units on Lake Michigan and Lake Macatawa, on the northern side of the channel connecting the two lakes. From the park, visitors can view the Holland Harbor Light, commonly known as "Big Red", across the channel.

== Sports ==
Logo	Club	Sport	League	Venue	Championships
	Holland Blast	Basketball (defunct team)	International Basketball League	Holland Civic Center	None
	Hope College Flying Dutchmen football	College football	Michigan Intercollegiate Athletic Association	Ray and Sue Smith Stadium
	Tulip City United SC	Soccer	Midwest Premier League	Holland High School Stadium	None
	Holland Struikrovers	Soccer	Midwest Premier League	Mac Bay Soccer Stadium	None

== Government ==
The City of Holland uses a council/manager form of government. The day-to-day operations of the city are under the supervision of the city manager and their staff. The city manager is responsible for selecting all department heads, preparation of the budget and supervision of all employees through their appointments.

The city manager serves at the direction of the mayor and city council which are elected positions. The current city manager is Keith Van Beek, former Ottawa County deputy county administrator, who was appointed in February 2018 by the city council.

Holland's city charter requires a mayor and eight city council members. The mayor serves a two-year term, and two at-large council members and six ward council members each serve four-year terms.

The current mayor is Nathan Bocks, a local attorney elected in November 2019.

- City council members as of December 2023 are:
  - Ward 1 - Tim Vreeman
  - Ward 2 - Lyn Raymond
  - Ward 3 - Bylnda Sól
  - Ward 4 - Kim Rowan
  - Ward 5 - Scott Corbin
  - Ward 6 - Devin Shea
  - At-Large - Michael Schultheis
  - At-Large - Quincy Byrd

The Holland Board of Public Works was created in 1883. It provides electricity, water and sewer services.

In February 1996, the Holland City Council approved a sister city relationship between Santiago de Querétaro, Querétaro, Mexico, and the City of Holland.

== Education ==
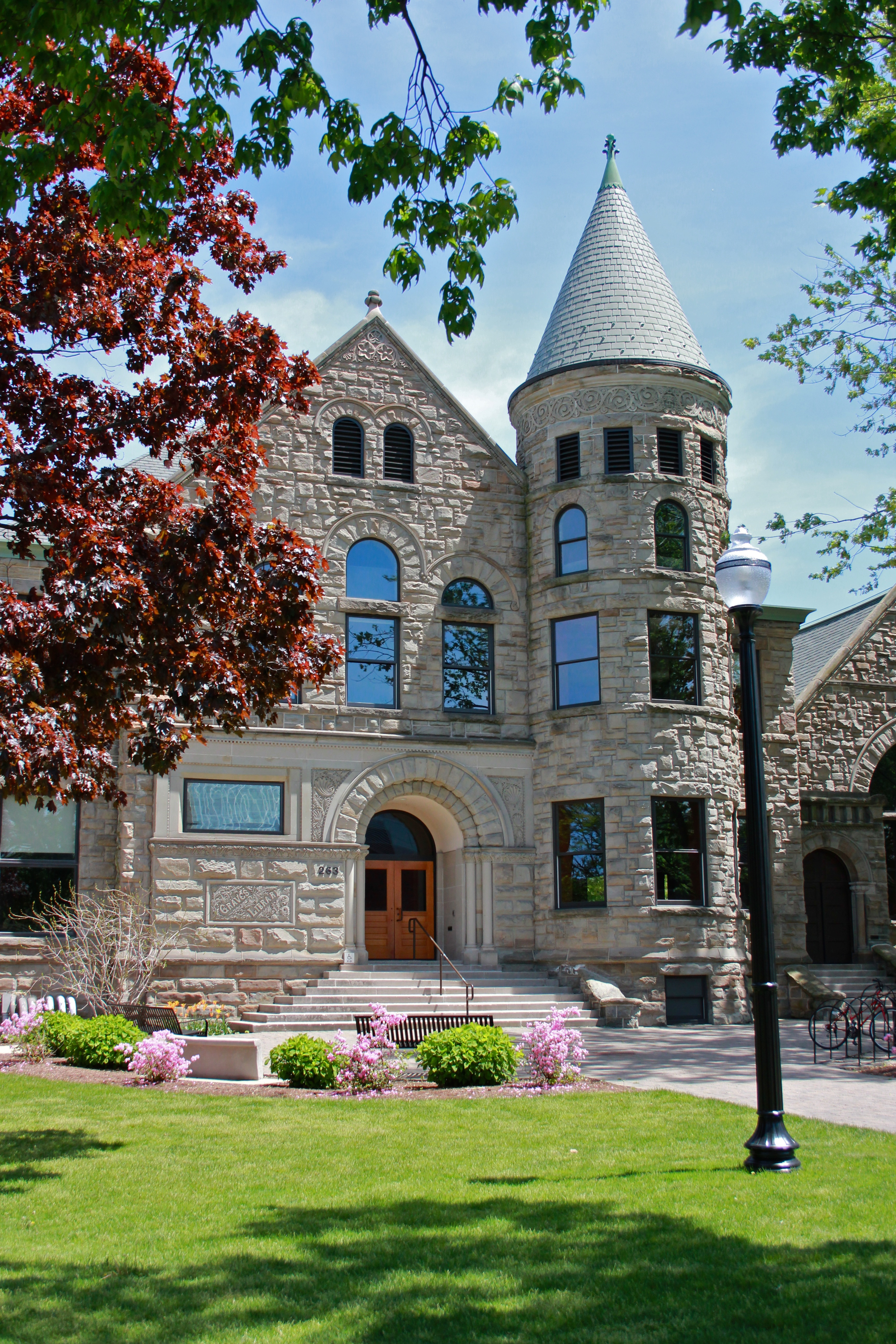
Graves Hall at Hope College

=== Higher-level academic institutions ===
- Hope College, a private four-year liberal arts college
- Western Theological Seminary, a graduate and professional school
- Grand Valley State University, with a campus in Holland (land donated to GVSU by the Meijer family)
- Davenport University, with a regional campus in Holland
- Grand Rapids Community College, Lakeshore Campus

=== Public schools ===
Within Ottawa County, almost all of Holland is within Holland Public Schools, except for a sliver to the northeast.

Within Allegan County, much of Holland is in Holland Public Schools while the rest is in Hamilton Community Schools.

Other educational institutions:

- Black River Public School, a charter school with kindergarten, elementary, secondary, and high school students
- Vanderbilt Charter Academy (K-8)
- Thompson M-TEC (adult training), a partnership between the Ottawa Area Intermediate School District and Grand Rapids Community College
- Eagle Crest Charter Academy

=== Private schools ===
- Holland Christian Schools (includes Holland Christian High School)
- Corpus Christi Catholic School
- Calvary Schools of Holland
- Holland Seventh-day Adventist School

== Transportation ==
The city is served by West Michigan Regional Airport, the Park Township Airport having closed on August 15, 2020. The airport is not served by regularly scheduled commercial carriers; the nearest airport with airline service is Gerald R. Ford International Airport in Grand Rapids, Michigan, about 35 mi (56 km) northeast.

The city also is served by regularly scheduled Amtrak service (the Pere Marquette) east to Grand Rapids and west to Chicago with connections to all points east and west.

The city and surrounding area is served by the MAX (Macatawa Area Express) transportation system, which offers both on-demand and high-speed bus service, linking different parts of the city as well as commercial, medical and government locations outside the city. This service evolved from the former "Dial-A-Ride Transportation" (DART) system.

The city is served by the following highways:

- I-196 (Gerald R. Ford Freeway)
- BL I-196
- US 31
- M-40
- A-2

The channel between Lake Macatawa and Lake Michigan allows pleasure craft and commercial boats, even bulk freighters, to access Holland's docks to unload coal, salt and iron scrap.

== Media ==
=== Newspapers ===
- Holland Sentinel, Holland's local daily newspaper/online edition
- Grand Rapids Press, formerly maintained a Holland newsroom and circulation office

=== Radio ===
- WHTC, 1450 WHTC and The New 99.7 FM
- WYVN, classic Hits for Holland and the Lakeshore, 92.7 FM
- WTHS - Hope College radio station, 89.9 FM

=== Television ===
- HCTV, Holland local television station

== Notable people ==
Holland is the hometown of four Medal of Honor recipients (tied with Pueblo, Colorado, both more than any other municipality in the United States): John Essebagger Jr., Paul Ronald Lambers, Matt Urban, and Gordon Douglas Yntema.

=== Arts and media ===
- Harry Bannister, actor
- Rhoda Janzen, author and Hope College professor
- Laurel Massé, jazz singer and founding member of The Manhattan Transfer; born in Holland
- Kennedy McMann, actress; born in Holland
- Lisa McMann, young-adult fiction writer; born in Holland
- James Michael, singer, songwriter, and record producer; attended Holland High School
- Sufjan Stevens, singer-songwriter; attended Hope College and wrote the song "Holland" for his 2003 album Michigan
- Mary Jeanne van Appledorn, composer, pianist, and educator
- Valerie van Heest, author, explorer, and museum designer
- Brian Vander Ark, lead singer of The Verve Pipe

=== Business and technology ===
- D. J. De Pree, founder and longtime president of Herman Miller
- Max DePree, writer, industrialist, and former CEO of Herman Miller
- Gerrard Wendell Haworth, founder of Haworth
- Charles Limbert, furniture designer and manufacturer who operated a factory in Holland
- Rob Malda, founder of Slashdot
- Nathan Oostendorp, founder of Everything2
- Edgar Prince, engineer and industrialist
- Erik Prince, founder of Blackwater USA

=== Education and science ===
- Mary Bruins Allison, physician and medical missionary; born in Holland
- James Bultman, longtime educator and former president of Hope College
- David Myers, psychologist and author; longtime Hope College professor
- Morris Steggerda, anthropologist and geneticist; born in Holland and graduated from Hope College
- Gordon Van Wylen, engineer and former president of Hope College
- John Paul Visscher, protozoologist; born in Holland and graduated from Hope College
- Maurice Visscher, cardiovascular physiologist; born in Holland and graduated from Hope College
- Nicholas J. Vogelzang, oncologist and cancer researcher; born in Holland

=== Government and law ===
- Robert Danhof, jurist
- John R. Dethmers, Michigan attorney general and chief justice of the Michigan Supreme Court; practiced law in Holland
- Betsy DeVos (born 1958), U.S. secretary of education, 2017–2021
- Gerrit J. Diekema, U.S. representative and minister to the Netherlands; born in Holland and served as mayor
- Pete Hoekstra, U.S. representative, 1993–2011; chairman of the House Intelligence Committee, 2004–2007; ambassador to the Netherlands
- Robert James Jonker, U.S. district judge; born in Holland
- William C. Vandenberg (1884–1971), 49th Lieutenant Governor of Michigan

=== Military ===
- John Essebagger Jr. (d. 1951), U.S. Army corporal, Korean War; Medal of Honor
- Paul Ronald Lambers (d. 1970), U.S. Army staff sergeant, Vietnam War; Medal of Honor
- Charles Symmonds, U.S. Army general
- Matt Urban (d. 1995), U.S. Army lieutenant colonel, World War II; Medal of Honor
- Gordon Douglas Yntema (d. 1968), U.S. Army sergeant, Vietnam War; Medal of Honor

=== Religion and activism ===
- Gijsbert Haan, Dutch-American religious leader and early Holland settler
- Alex Koroknay-Palicz, youth rights advocate
- Albertus van Raalte, Dutch Reformed minister who founded Holland and helped establish Hope College

=== Sports ===
- Franklin Cappon, basketball coach at Michigan and Princeton
- Kirk Cousins, NFL quarterback; attended Holland Christian High School
- Lane Hutson, NHL player; born in Holland
- Morley Jennings, College Football Hall of Fame player and coach; born in Holland
- Ron Schipper, longtime Hope College football coach and member of the College Football Hall of Fame
- Joel Smeenge, NFL defensive end; born in Holland
- Herman Stegeman, college athlete, coach, and athletic director
- Andy Van Hekken, professional baseball player
- Luke Witkowski, professional hockey player
- George Zuverink, Major League Baseball pitcher; born in Holland

== See also ==
- Herrick District Library
- Holland Civic Center
- Murder of Janet Chandler
