= Cai Cai Camp =

Cai Cai Camp (Cai Cai Airfield)
- Bình Thạnh Đông, Plain of Reeds in Vietnam

Site information
- Type: Army Base
- Operator: Army of the Republic of Vietnam (ARVN); United States Army (U.S. Army)
- Condition: Abandoned

Location
- Shown within Vietnam
- Coordinates: 10.9258°N 105.51°E

Site history
- Built: 1965
- In use: 1965-1973
- Battles/wars: Vietnam War

Garrison information
- Garrison: 5th Special Forces Group

Airfield information
- Elevation: 7 feet (2 m) AMSL
Runways
Direction	Length and surface
00/00	1,500 feet (457 m) Clay

Cai Cai Camp (also known as Cai Cai Special Forces Camp or Dan Chu Camp) is a former U.S. Army and Army of the Republic of Vietnam (ARVN) base northwest of Bình Thạnh Đông on the Plain of Reeds in southern Vietnam.

== History ==
The base was established by the 5th Special Forces Group Detachment A-412 in April 1965 30 km northwest of Bình Thạnh Đông and 3 km from the Cambodian border.

The camp was frequently a target for Vietcong fire and was severely damaged by flooding in 1965 and 1966. In 1967 Detachment A-412 was redesignated as Detachment A-431.

On 18 January 1968 forces from Detachment A-431 engaged a Vietcong force near the camp and SGT Gordon Douglas Yntema would be posthumously awarded the Medal of Honor for his actions during the battle.

The base was handed over to the ARVN 76th Border Rangers in September 1970.

== Current use ==
The base has been turned over to farmland and housing.
