= Gordon Douglas Yntema =

United States Army Medal of Honor recipient (1945–1968)

- Army Medal of Honor
- Born: June 26, 1945; Bethesda, Maryland, US
- Died: January 18, 1968 (aged 22) near Bình Thạnh Đông, An Giang Province, Republic of Vietnam
- Burial place: Pilgrim Home Cemetery, Holland, Michigan
- Military career
- Allegiance: United States of America
- Branch: United States Army
- Service years: 1964–1968
- Rank: Sergeant
- Unit: 5th Special Forces Group
- Conflicts: Vietnam War †
- Awards: Medal of Honor; Silver Star; Purple Heart (2)

Gordon Douglas Yntema (June 26, 1945 – January 18, 1968) was a United States Army soldier and a recipient of the United States military's highest decoration—the Medal of Honor—for his actions in the Vietnam War.

== Biography ==
Gordon Yntema graduated from Holland High School in Holland, MI and Culver Military Academy Culver, Indiana in 1963

Yntema joined the Army from Detroit, Michigan in 1964, and by January 16, 1968, was serving as a Sergeant in Company D of the 5th Special Forces Group (Airborne). On that day, near Thong Binh in the Republic of Vietnam, Yntema and the two platoons of irregulars he was with were involved in a heavy firefight with the Viet Cong. After the group's Vietnamese commander was wounded, Yntema led the force for the remainder of the two-day battle as ammunition dwindled and losses mounted. With his position about to be overrun, he refused to abandon his wounded comrades and instead fought to the death.

Yntema, aged 22 at his death, was buried in Pilgrim Home Cemetery, Holland, Michigan. He and his wife Peggy had two daughters, Elizabeth and Jane.

The enlisted club at Fort Bragg, NC is named in his honor.

== Medal of Honor citation ==
Sergeant Yntema's official Medal of Honor citation reads:

For conspicuous gallantry and intrepidity in action at the risk of his life and above and beyond the call of duty. Sgt. Yntema, U.S. Army, distinguished himself while assigned to Detachment A-431, Company D. As part of a larger force of civilian irregulars from Camp Cai Cai, he accompanied 2 platoons to a blocking position east of the village of Thong Binh, where they became heavily engaged in a small-arms fire fight with the Viet Cong. Assuming control of the force when the Vietnamese commander was seriously wounded, he advanced his troops to within 50 meters of the enemy bunkers. After a fierce 30 minute fire fight, the enemy forced Sgt. Yntema to withdraw his men to a trench in order to afford them protection and still perform their assigned blocking mission. Under cover of machinegun fire, approximately 1 company of Viet Cong maneuvered into a position which pinned down the friendly platoons from 3 sides. A dwindling ammunition supply, coupled with a Viet Cong mortar barrage which inflicted heavy losses on the exposed friendly troops, caused many of the irregulars to withdraw. Seriously wounded and ordered to withdraw himself, Sgt. Yntema refused to leave his fallen comrades. Under withering small arms and machinegun fire, he carried the wounded Vietnamese commander and a mortally wounded American Special Forces advisor to a small gully 50 meters away in order to shield them from the enemy fire. Sgt. Yntema then continued to repulse the attacking Viet Cong attempting to overrun his position until, out of ammunition and surrounded, he was offered the opportunity to surrender. Refusing, Sgt. Yntema stood his ground, using his rifle as a club to fight the approximately 15 Viet Cong attempting his capture. His resistance was so fierce that the Viet Cong were forced to shoot in order to overcome him. Sgt. Yntema's personal bravery in the face of insurmountable odds and supreme self-sacrifice were in keeping with the highest traditions of the military service and reflect the utmost credit upon himself, the 1st Special Forces, and the U.S. Army.

== Commendations ==
Yntema has been awarded the following:

Badge	Combat Infantryman Badge		
1st Row	Medal of Honor		
2nd Row	Silver Star	Purple Heart with 1 bronze Oak leaf cluster (2 awards)	Army Good Conduct Medal
3rd Row	National Defense Service Medal	Vietnam Service Medal with 2 bronze Campaign stars	Vietnam Campaign Medal with "60-" clasp
Badges	Special Forces Tab		Parachutist Badge

== See also ==
- List of Medal of Honor recipients for the Vietnam War
