= Zeeland Christian School =

Coordinates: 42.8099°N 86.0274°W

Zeeland Christian School (ZCS) is a K-8 Christian school in Zeeland, Michigan.

== History ==
It was established circa 1915.

In a period prior to 1954, some classes were held at Cherry Avenue School and Third Christian Reformed Church. In 1954 the school added five classrooms.

Prior to 1965 the school only included up to junior high school and referred students to Holland Christian High School, the senior high school of Holland Christian School. The Zeeland Christian School high school was scheduled to open in 1965, but the plans were scrapped.

The school has a special education program for children with learning disabilities. By 2008 it began a 16,500 square feet (1,530 m^{2}) expansion, paying $2 million from a $3 million capital campaign, partly to better accommodate that program.

As of 2017 it had 1,101 students, making it Michigan's second largest private school by enrollment in a single campus, if preschoolers are included. From the 2009–2010 school year to the 2014–2015 school year, the enrollment count minus preschoolers increased by 10%.

== Curriculum ==
The school began an immersion program for the Mandarin Chinese language for grades K-8. The first students to graduate from the program did so in 2020.

Beginning in 2006, Zeeland Christian also has a Spanish Immersion Program, beginning in Threeschool, and extending up to 8th grade, with the first class graduating in 2014.
