= Holland Downtown Historic District =

Historic district in Michigan, United States

- U.S. National Register of Historic Places
- U.S. Historic district
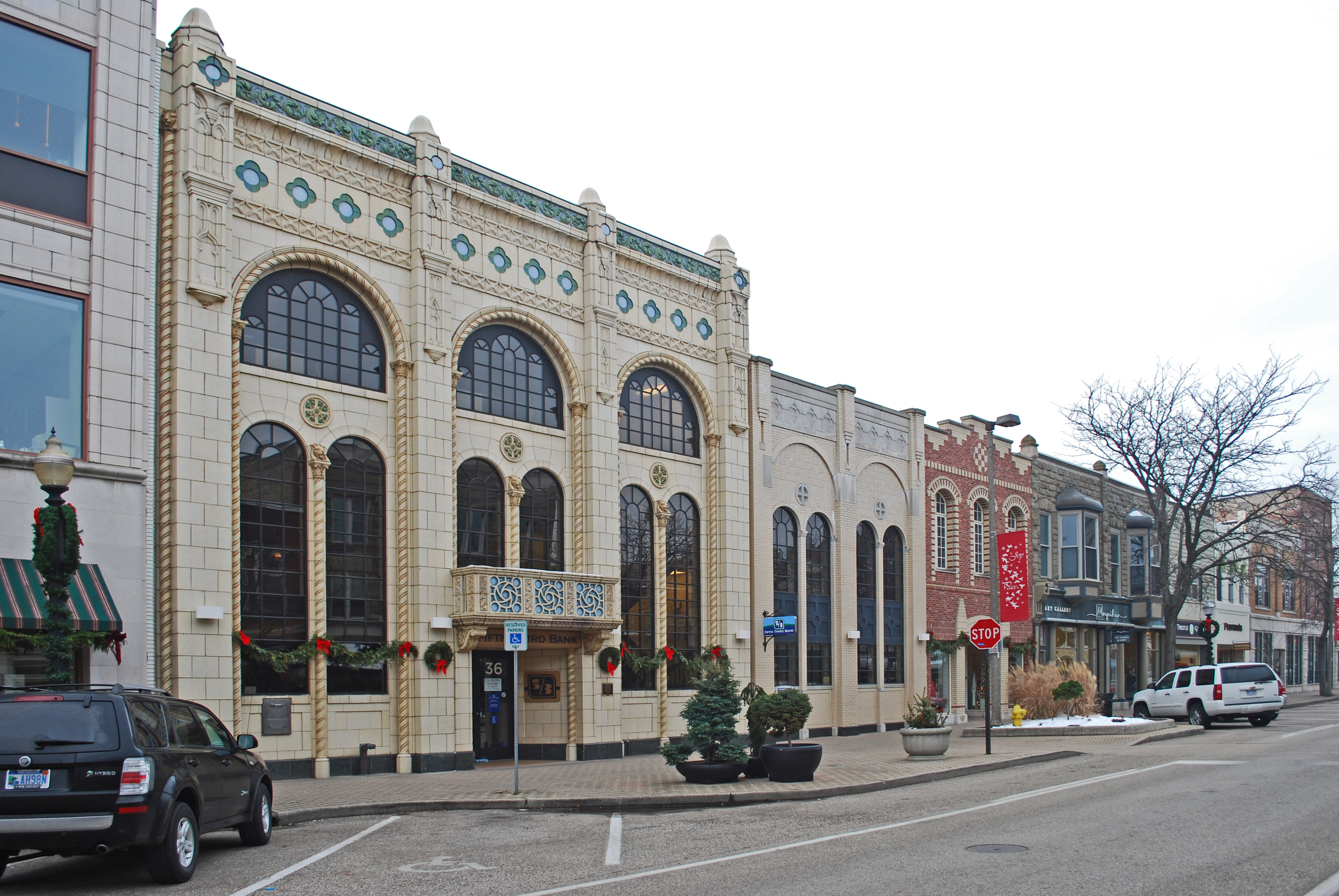
- Eighth St. west of College, looking west

- Location within Michigan Location within the United States
- Interactive map
- Location: Roughly, Eighth St. from just E of College Ave. to River Ave. and River Ave. from Ninth St. to just N of Eighth St., Holland, Michigan
- Coordinates: 42°47′24″N 86°6′26″W
- Area: 14 acres (5.7 ha)
- Built: 1871
- Architect: Multiple
- Architectural style: Renaissance Revival, Late Victorian, Richardsonian Romanesque
- NRHP reference No.: 90001534
- Added to NRHP: October 4, 1990

The Holland Downtown Historic District is a commercial historic district located along Eighth Street from just east of College Avenue to River Avenue, and along and River Avenue from Ninth Street to just north of Eighth Street in Holland, Michigan. The district was listed on the National Register of Historic Places in 1990.

== History ==
The section along Eighth Street has been the center of Holland's commercial shopping district since the founding of the city in 1847. However, a disastrous forest fire in 1871 destroyed much of the town, including the entire commercial district in the center of the city. Reconstruction was hindered by the economic Panic of 1873, but much of the downtown had been rebuilt by 1875. However, this first wave of rebuilding was primarily composed of two-story false-front frame structures, none of which remain within the district. The first brick buildings constructed were probably the two-storefront wide VanDerVeen Hardware Building at 36 West Eighth and the original section of the City Hotel, on the site of the Hotel Warm Friend.

Holland's population grew immensely in the later part of the 19th century, increasing from 2400 in 1871 to 7790 by 1900. Railroads and shipping infrastructure was built, and the industrial base of the city grew, and the commercial area followed suit. Beginning in the 1880s and continuing through the 1920s, a building boom resulted in the former wooden buildings in downtown being replaced with brick structures.

== Description ==
The Holland Downtown Historic District contains 59 contributing and 24 non-contributing structures. Most of the buildings are two- and three-story commercial structures, built in the late nineteenth and early twentieth centuries, and having brick, stone, or terra cotta facades. The buildings stand directly on the line of the sidewalk. The largest buildings stand in the center of the district at the corner of Eight Street and Central: the former Steketee's store at 4 East Eighth and the six-story, former Hotel Warm Friend at 5 East Eighth.

The oldest buildings in the district are Italianate in design, with the buildings at 24 East and 36 West Eight Street being the only examples. Other buildings span Late Victorian architectural styles, and include Renaissance Revival and Richardsonian Romanesque structures. Some of the significant structures in the district include:

- Holland City State Bank (190 River Avenue, at Eighth): This massive three-story Richardsonian Romanesque bank is constructed of rock-face blocks of Waverly stone, and has a distinctive pyramid-roof corner tower that provides a landmark for the downtown.
- Knickerbocker (Holland) Theater Building (86 East Eighth): This 20th century commercial building has a high, stepped-pediment facade with a classical cornice and a pediment.
- First National (now First of America) Bank (1 West Eighth): This is the only Classical Revival building in the district. It is clad with limestone, and has an Ionic portico in antis.
- Steketee's Department Store (44 East Eighth): This six-story building has a facade that is nearly all window, with terra cotta bands marking the divisions between floors. The roofline undulates, with raised areas containing colored Art Deco terra-cotta ornamentation.
- Hotel Warm Friend (5 East Eighth): The largest building in the district is a six-story structure made from red brick with limestone trim. The building is nine bays wide, and has a Dutch gable in the center of its facade. Completed in 1925, the building occupies the site of earlier hotels - the City Hotel and the Hotel Holland - which date back to 1871

== Gallery ==
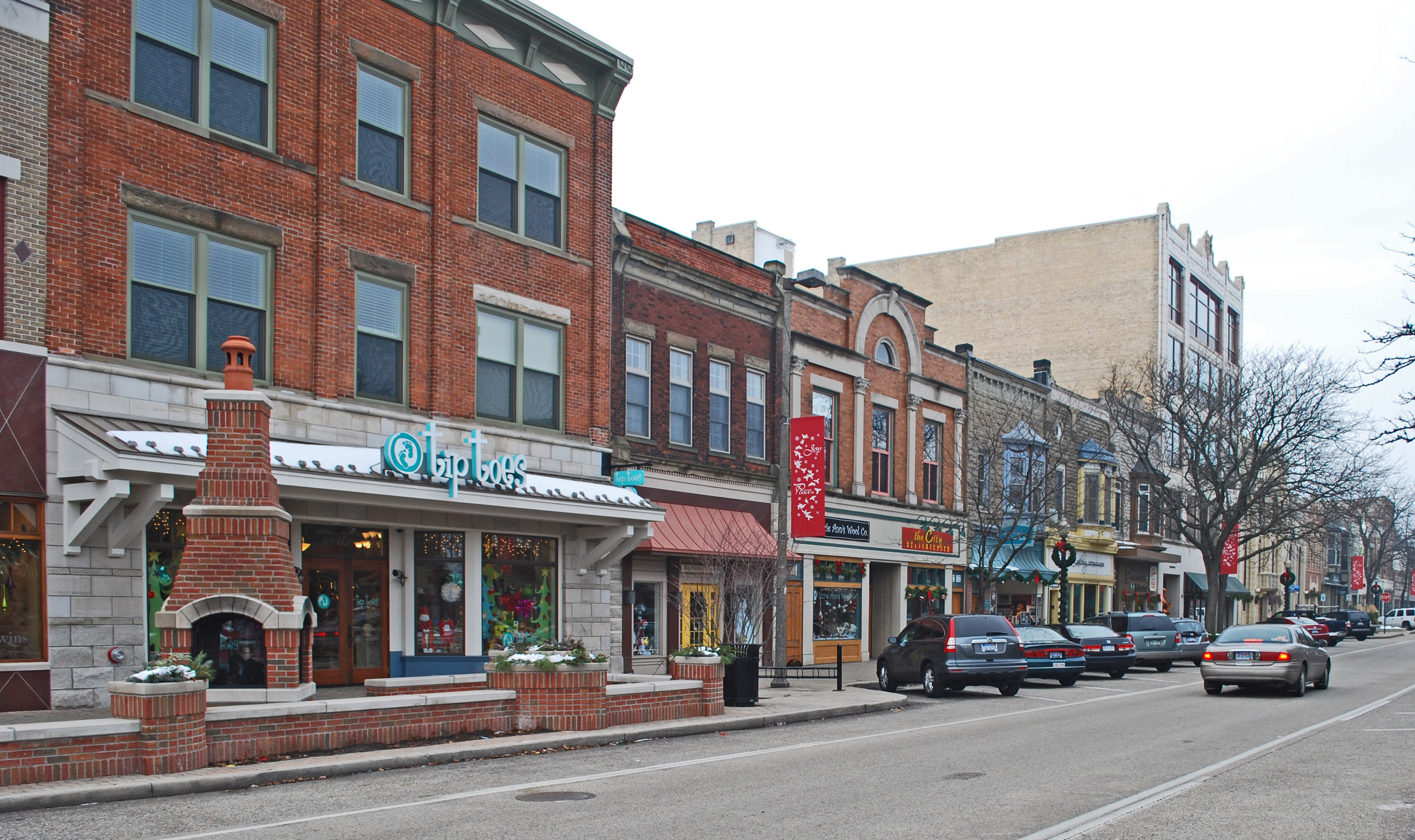
Eighth Street at College, looking west

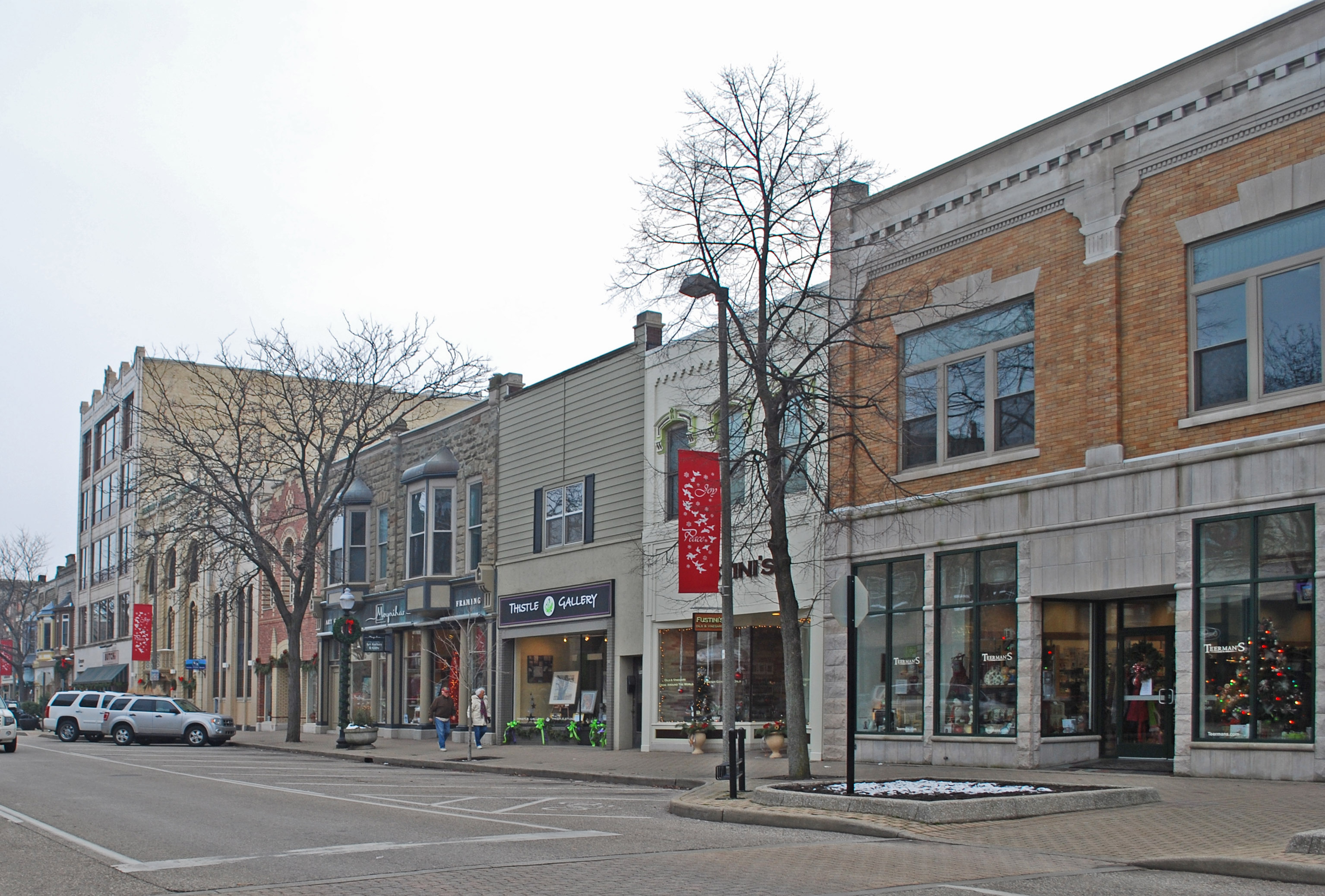
Eighth Street east of Central, looking east (south side)

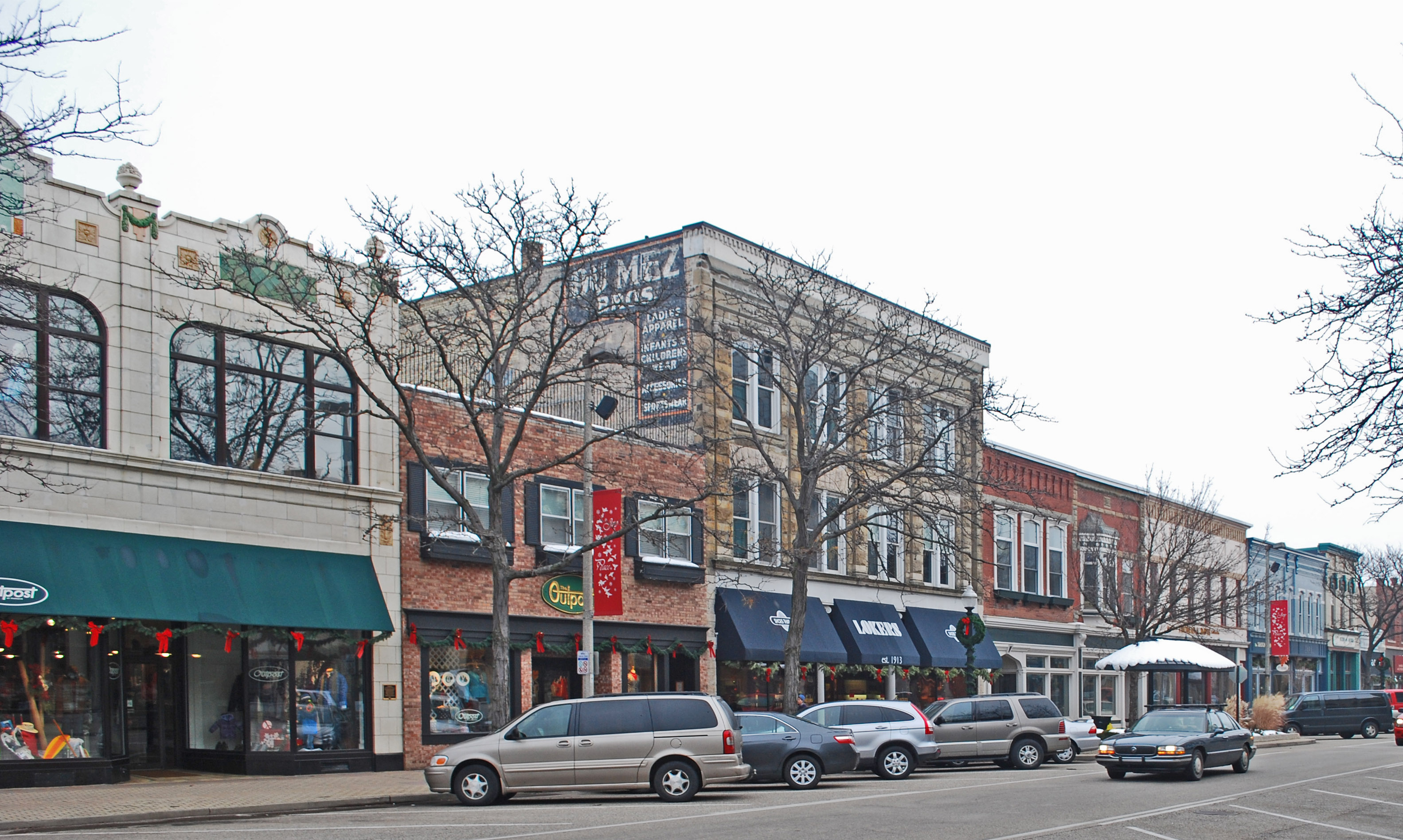
Eighth Street east of Central, looking east (north side)

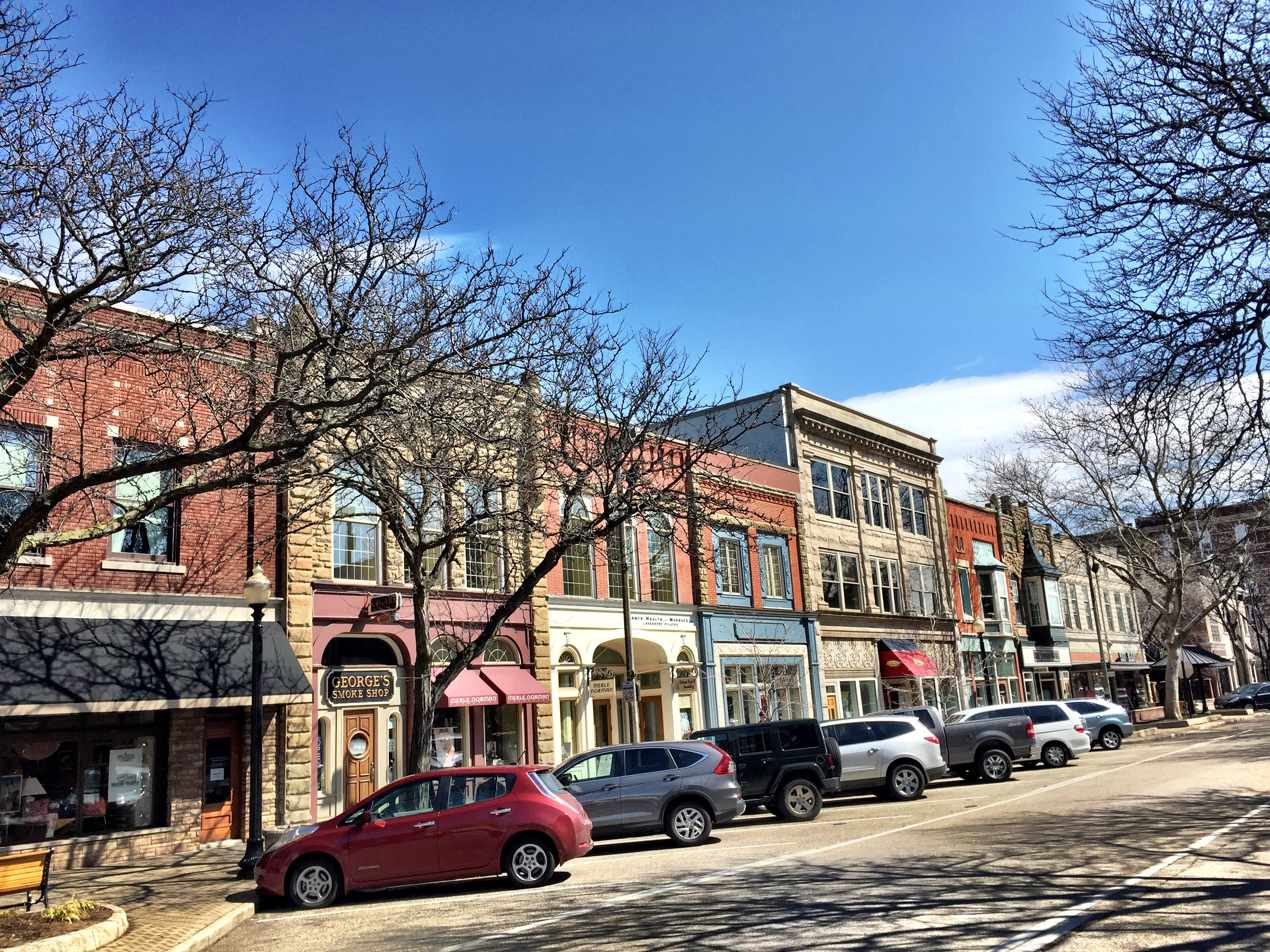
Eighth Street at River, looking east
