= Murder of Janet Chandler =

1979 murder of an American college student in Holland, Michigan

- Location: Holland, Michigan, U.S.
- Date: January 30–31, 1979
- Attack type: Kidnapping, gang rape, strangulation
- Victims: Janet Marie Chandler, aged 22
- Perpetrators: Arthur Carlton Paiva; James Cleophas Nelson; Freddie Bass Parker; Anthony Eugene Robert Williams; Robert Michael Lynch; Laurie Ann Swank
- Convicted: All six (four at trial in 2007; two by plea agreement)

The murder of Janet Chandler occurred on January 30–31, 1979, in Holland, Michigan, United States. Chandler, a 22-year-old senior at Hope College, was abducted from the Blue Mill Inn, where she worked the overnight front desk, and was gang-raped and strangled by a group that included Wackenhut security guards lodged at the inn during a local labor strike and her supervisor at the inn. The case remained unsolved for more than 25 years, during which the participants did not come forward.

Interest in the case was revived in 2004 by Who Killed Janet Chandler?, a documentary produced by a Hope College communication class, which led to the formation of a cold case team by the Holland Police Department and the Michigan State Police. Six people were arrested in 2006. Two pled guilty to second-degree murder and testified for the prosecution, and four former guards were convicted at trial in 2007 and sentenced to life imprisonment.

== Background ==
Janet Marie Chandler was from Muskegon, Michigan. She was a senior music student at Hope College and worked as a night auditor and desk clerk at the Blue Mill Inn, a motel near U.S. 31 and 16th Street in Holland.

In October 1978, union workers went on strike at a Chemetron Corporation chemical plant in Holland. The company hired Wackenhut to provide security, and roughly 70 out-of-town guards were housed at the Blue Mill Inn. Arthur Paiva was the highest-ranking Wackenhut guard based in Holland and served as the on-site coordinator. Laurie Swank was a manager at the inn, Chandler's supervisor, and her housemate.

According to evidence presented at trial, Chandler had been in a relationship with Paiva after the strike began; Paiva was abusive, and the relationship ended. Swank, who was jealous of the attention Chandler received from the guards, told Paiva about Chandler's relationships with other guards in order to make him think less of her. Paiva became extremely upset and vowed that he "would take care of it".

== Murder ==
On the night of January 30–31, 1979, Paiva and James Nelson organized what was presented to Chandler as a "surprise party". Chandler was taken from the inn to a house used by the guards, where she was bound with duct tape and repeatedly raped by multiple men while others watched. One guard photographed the assault. A belt placed around her neck was tightened until she died of strangulation. Swank was present during the assault and left before Chandler's body was disposed of.

Guard Robert Lynch drove the body away and left it in a wooded area beside Interstate 196. At about 1:30 a.m. on February 1, 1979, a snowplow driver found Chandler's unclothed body near the highway, about 35 miles (56 km) south of Holland. (Note: Contemporary and later news accounts place the body on I-196 south of South Haven, about seven miles from that city; the 2009 Michigan Court of Appeals opinion describes the location as "outside Grand Haven".)

== Investigation ==
The killing became Holland's only unsolved homicide. Although many guards and inn staff had knowledge of the events, none came forward for more than two decades.

=== Documentary ===
In the fall of 2003, David Schock, an associate professor of communication at Hope College, led a documentary class that produced Who Killed Janet Chandler?, an 80-minute film about the unsolved case. It premiered in January 2004 at the college's Knickerbocker Theatre and was later broadcast on public television in Grand Rapids. The resulting media attention was credited by police with prompting the investigation's revival, and on April 28, 2004, police announced a multijurisdictional cold case team made up of Holland Police Department and Michigan State Police investigators. Investigators conducted more than 300 interviews in 18 states. The documentary later won the Audience Choice Award for Best Feature Documentary at the 2008 TriMedia Film Festival in Fort Collins, Colorado.

=== Arrests ===
Robert Lynch, then 66 and living in Three Oaks, Michigan, was arrested in February 2006. On September 18–19, 2006, five more suspects were arrested in Michigan, Pennsylvania, West Virginia, and Wisconsin: James Cleophas "Bubba" Nelson, Arthur Carlton "Carl" Paiva, Freddie Bass Parker, Laurie Ann Swank, and Anthony Eugene Williams. Each was charged with three counts of first-degree murder, covering both premeditated murder and felony murder committed during a kidnapping and criminal sexual conduct. Michigan Attorney General Mike Cox said the investigation's mission had been "to ensure that the family of Janet Chandler sees justice".

== Legal proceedings ==
Lynch and Swank accepted plea agreements, each pleading guilty to second-degree murder and testifying against the other defendants.

Paiva, Nelson, Parker, and Williams were tried together before a jury in the Ottawa County Circuit Court in Grand Haven, and were convicted in November 2007. Paiva was found guilty of first-degree premeditated murder; Nelson, Parker, and Williams were found guilty of second-degree murder; and all four were found guilty on two counts of felony murder. The trial court vacated the second-degree murder convictions, and on December 10, 2007, each defendant was sentenced to life imprisonment for first-degree felony murder. The Michigan Court of Appeals affirmed the convictions on July 30, 2009.

=== Civil litigation ===
Chandler's father, James F. Chandler Sr., filed a lawsuit against Wackenhut alleging negligent hiring and supervision of its guards. The suit was dismissed as untimely, and in February 2012 the United States Court of Appeals for the Sixth Circuit affirmed the dismissal, holding that Michigan law did not allow the statute of limitations to be tolled on the basis of the alleged concealment of the crime.

== Aftermath ==
Paiva died of respiratory failure in a prison hospital in Jackson, Michigan, on March 13, 2013, at the age of 61. Nelson died in prison on June 8, 2020. Swank was released from prison in 2016.

== In media ==
- Who Killed Janet Chandler? (2004), documentary directed by David Schock with Hope College students.
- "Conspiracy of Silence", a 2008 episode of Dateline NBC.

== See also ==
- Cold case
- Code of silence
