= Herrick District Library =

- 42.7863°N 86.1098°W
- Location: Holland, Michigan
- Established: 1960

Collection
- Size: 243,000 items in print, over 41,000 audio visual items

Access and use
- Population served: Over 102,000

Other information
- Public transit access: MAX
- Website: www.herrickdl.org

Herrick District Library is a public library system serving the residents of Holland, Michigan and the surrounding townships. In 2008-2009, over the course of 583,000 visits, library cardholders checked out 1.2 million items.

== History ==
Although Holland Township obtained its first library in 1847, it was not until 1867, when Holland became a city, that the Holland Public Library established its own collection. The library was housed first on the second floor of the old City Hall on 8th Street, later moved to the second floor of the Model Drug Store, also on 8th Street, and in 1911 finally moved to the new City Hall on 12th Street, where it remained until 1960, when the city built the Herrick Public Library.

In 1953, Hazel Hayes, Holland's first professional librarian, was hired. Recognizing the city's need for funding for a new library, she wrote a letter to Ray Herrick, the owner of Tecumseh Products and originally from the Holland area, asking if he was interested in helping the library obtain a new building. Months later, he anonymously donated $300,000 to build a public library for the city of Holland. Following his gift, other groups donated funds, and in 1960, the newly built Herrick Public Library opened its doors on River Ave. between 12th and 13th Streets. Holland's mayor at the time, Robert Visscher, rejoiced at the opening of the new library, saying, "Never in the history of the community has anything so wonderful happened to the city of Holland…There is nothing we need as much as a new library."

In 1971, in order to expand its service area, Herrick District Library joined the Lakeland Library Federation, which became the Lakeland Library Cooperative in 1977, allowing library patrons access to a larger collection.

Since its opening in 1960, the Herrick Library's service area has grown from 25,000 to over 102,000 people, and this would not be possible if not for the 1999 library expansion. Prior to the renovation, Herrick Library faced numerous space challenges and could not adequately serve its patrons. Library consultant Anders Dahlgren reported that Herrick was 42 percent lower than the national average in terms of the number of volumes held and that 60 percent more space was needed just to house the number of collections at that time.

Spatially, the library was insufficient. Staff members were overcrowded in offices, auditorium space was insufficient, programming and event space was limited and there were no conference rooms at all. In addition, Herrick was forced to remove many videos, books, art and reference materials to make room for newer materials, most patrons waited in check out lines for 10 minutes or more, and the number of patrons in the library eliminated the library's ability to offer a quiet reading environment.

The expansion came after a long-awaited millage referendum and the switch from Herrick's status as a public library to a district library. The switch meant that the control of the library shifted from the City of Holland to an area wide board, allowing for a more reasonable form of funding. In December 1996, the District Library Planning Committee endorsed a "resolution of intent" to fund a library district which was unanimously supported. Then in 1997, focus was placed on receiving a millage referendum that sought $11.5 million in funding. On May 6, 1997, the City of Holland as well as surrounding Townships voted to approve 1.5 mills for a period of 20 years to support the establishment and operation of the Herrick District Library.

The renovation began on January 4, 1998 and took 18 months with the reopening occurring on June 11, 1999. The new building has been increased in size by 48,144 square feet (4,472.7 m^{2}), or 200 percent over the original building, leaving a total square footage of 72,291, and was designed by Frye, Gillan & Molinaro Architects Ltd.

In addition to the new Herrick District Library, the North Side Branch, located on Riley St., was completed in early 2000, giving Herrick an additional 5,200 square feet (480 m^{2}).

In 2016, voters overwhelmingly approved a renewal of the library's operating millage. The millage will allow for many improvements, including expansion at the North Branch and additional hours at each location. The library checks out more than 1 million physical and digital items each year.
