= Nathan Oostendorp =

American businessman

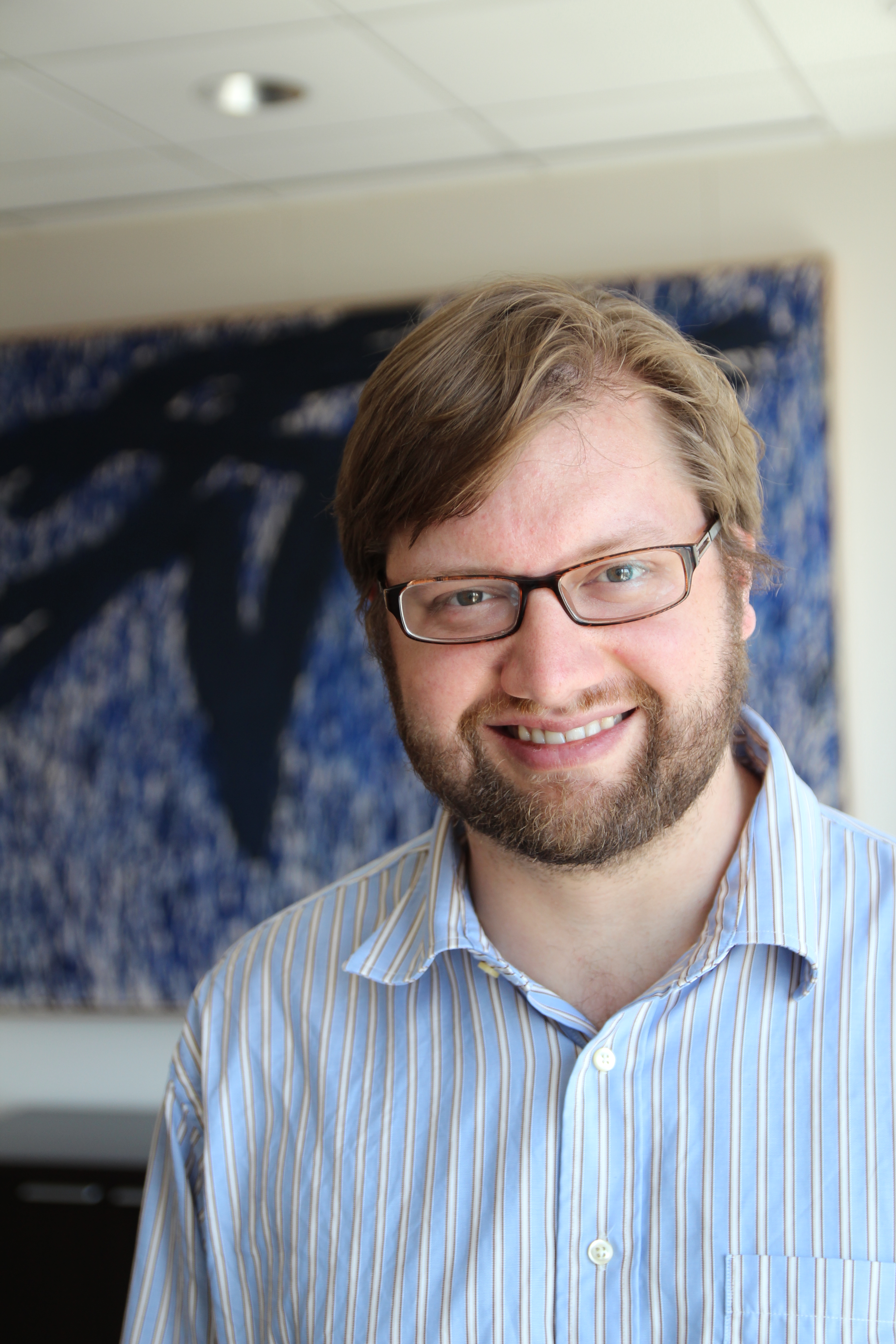
Nathan Oostendorp in May 2012

Nathan Oostendorp is an American technologist, author, and entrepreneur. He is from Holland, Michigan, and is a co-founder of the technology news website and community Slashdot and founder of the online community Everything2.

== Biography ==
Oostendorp was a contributor and content editor of Slashdot as well as an author of the SlashCode software—Slashdot's freely licensed technological platform. He was a founder of the firm Blockstackers Intergalactic (BSI), which managed and developed the website. In addition to his work on Slashdot, Oostendorp's work at BSI included the creation of the early online encyclopedia project Everything2, and the Perl programming web community PerlMonks, which used the Everything Engine. After the sale of BSI to Andover.net and subsequently to VA Linux Systems (which became Geeknet), Oostendorp worked as a developer and manager at the free software and open source hosting platform SourceForge.

Oostendorp has a master's degree in Information Economics from the University of Michigan School of Information. While at Michigan, he published several academic papers based on his experience with online communities.

Oostendorp founded the Ann Arbor, Michigan-based Internet of Things startup Sight Machine (formerly Ingenuitas)m focused on industrial applications of computer vision techniques. He is the author of the software SimpleCV, and holds a patent related to computer vision.
