= Everything2 =

Online community and website

- Screenshot of Everything2.com
- Website type: General writers site
- Available in: English
- Owner: Everything2 Media LLC
- Founder: Nathan Oostendorp
- Website: everything2.com
- Commercial: No
- Registration: Required for write access
- Launched: March 1998 (as Everything1)
- Current status: Active

Everything2 (styled Everything_{2} or E2 for short) is a collaborative online community consisting of a database of interlinked user-submitted written material. E2 is moderated for quality, but has no formal policy on subject matter. Writing on E2 covers a wide range of topics and genres, including encyclopedic articles, diary entries (known as "daylogs"), poetry, humor, and fiction.

== History ==
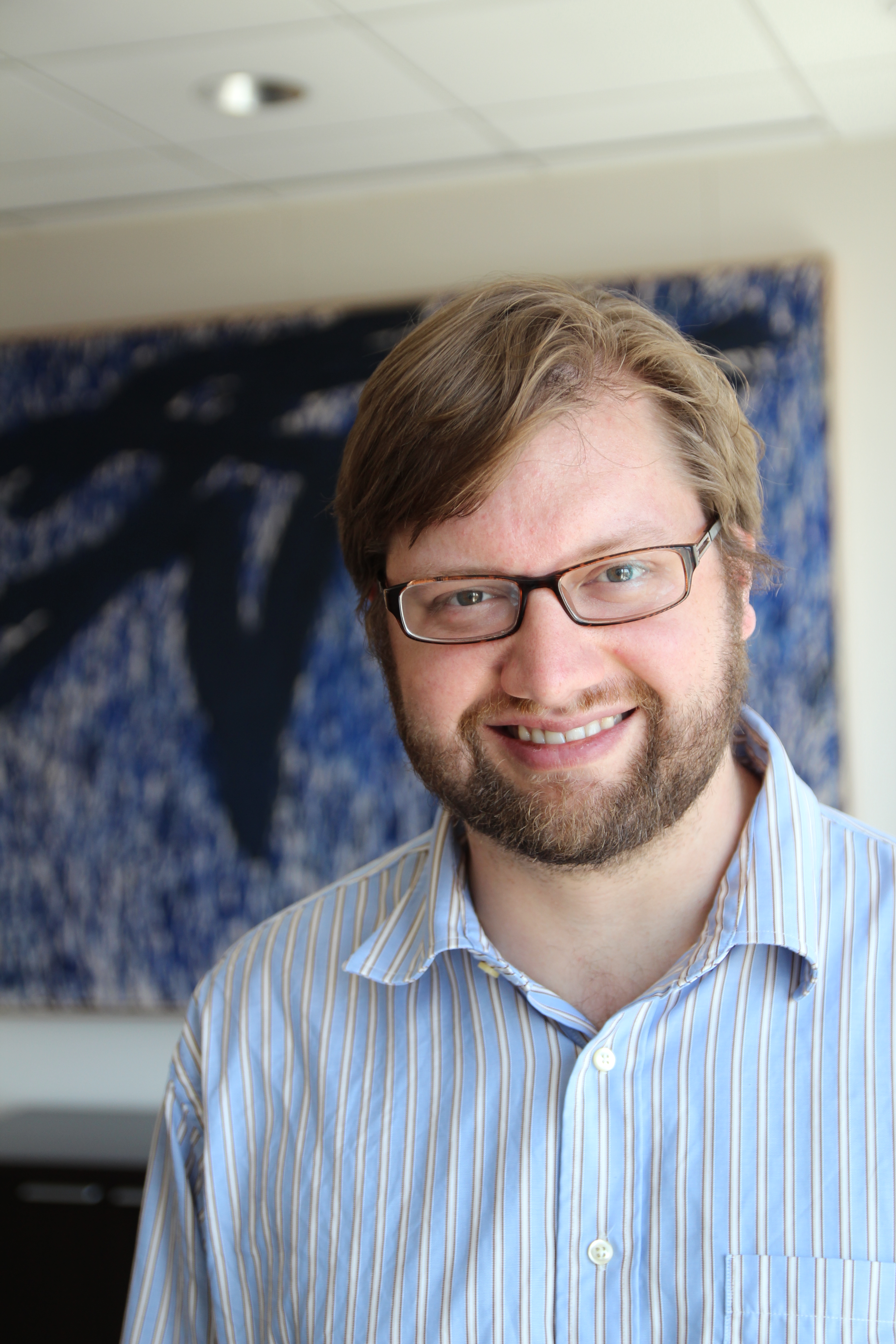
Founder Nathan Oostendorp in 2012

The predecessor of E2 was a similar database called Everything (later labeled "Everything1" or "E1") which was started around March 1998 by Nathan Oostendorp and was initially closely aligned with and promoted by the technology-related news website Slashdot (by virtue of various key principals having attended the Holland Christian High School), even sharing (at the time) some administrators. The Everything2 software offered vastly more features, and the Everything1 data was twice incorporated into E2: once on November 13, 1999, and again in January 2000.

The Everything2 server used to be colocated with the Slashdot servers. However, some time after OSDN acquired Slashdot, and moved the Slashdot servers, this hosting was terminated on short notice. This resulted in Everything2 being offline from roughly November 6 to December 9, 2003. Everything2 was then hosted by the University of Michigan for a time. As the Everything2 site put it on October 2, 2006:

Now, we have an arrangement with the University of Michigan, located in Ann Arbor. We exist thanks to their generosity (which is motivated by their academic curiosity, I suppose). They gave us some servers and act as our ISP, free of charge, and all they ask in exchange is that we not display advertisements.

The Everything2 servers were moved to the nearby Michigan State University in February 2007.

E2 was privately owned by the Blockstackers Intergalactic company, but does not make a profit and is viewed by its long-term users as a collaborative work-in-progress. Until mid-2007 it accepted donations of money and, on occasion, of computer hardware but no longer does so. Some of its administrators are affiliated with Blockstackers, some are not. The site is not a democracy, and the degree to which users influence decisions depends on the nature of the decisions and the administrators making them. As of January 23, 2012, it was announced that the site had been sold to long-time user and coder Jay Bonci under the name Everything2 Media LLC.

Writeups in E1 were limited to 512 bytes in size. This, plus the predominantly "geek" membership back then and the lack of chat facilities, meant the early work was often of poor quality and was filled with self-referential humor. As E2 has expanded, stricter quality standards have developed, much of the old material has been removed, and the membership has become broader in interest, although smaller in number. Many noders prefer to write encyclopedic articles similar to those on Wikipedia (and indeed some actively contribute to both E2 and Wikipedia). Some write fiction or poetry, some discuss issues, and some write daily journals, called "daylogs". Unlike Wikipedia, E2 does not have an enforced neutral point of view. An informal survey of noder political beliefs indicates that the user base tends to lean left politically. There are conservative voices as well, however, and while debate nodes (of any kind, political or not) are rarely tolerated, well-formed points of view from any part of the political or cultural spectrum are.

Despite predating Wikipedia as a collaborative user-generated online encyclopedia, Everything2 never achieved Wikipedia's level of popularity. Information science scholar Cliff Lampe ascribes this to a combination of factors including "editorial issues" and Everything2's launch before the dot-com crash. According to E2's "Site Trajectory", traffic has dropped from 9976 new write-ups created in the month of August 2000, down to 93 new write-ups in February 2017.

== Community ==
=== Policies ===
Some of the management regard Everything2 as a publication, to which authors submit content. Although Everything2 does not seek to become an encyclopedia, a substantial amount of factual content has been submitted to Everything2.

Policy states that "Everything2 is not a bulletin board." Writeups which exist as replies to other writeups, or which add a minor point to them or which otherwise do not stand well alone are discouraged, not least because the deletion of the original writeup orphans any replies. This policy helps to moderate flame wars on controversial topics.

Everything2 is not a wiki, and there is no direct way for non-content editors to make corrections or amendments to another author's article. Avenues for correction involve discussing the writeup with its author; petitioning a content editor; adding a note in a special "broken nodes" section; or superseding the original writeup with an original, stand-alone follow-up.

=== Nodes and writeups ===
E2 users called noders create entries called nodes and add information in multiple writeups. Only logged-in users can create writeups, and only the author of a writeup or an editor appointed by the site administrators can edit a writeup. E2 categorizes writeups into thirteen types: person, place, idea, thing, dream, personal, fiction, poetry, review, log, recipe, essay, and event. Two additional writeup types, lede and definition, are usable only by editors and are applied retroactively. Writeups are written in a simplified HTML dialect and do not contain images.

There are other types of nodes that do not contain writeups; for instance, the administrators can create "superdoc" nodes (similar to Wikipedia's special pages) such as Everything New Nodes and Page of Cool that allow interaction, and each user has a "homenode" where he or she can add a short autobiography or other text (or a picture, if the user has posted ten writeups—see Rewards, below).

== Copyright practice ==
The copyright in a writeup rests with the author, and no agreement to any kind of license is entered into by writing on E2 (except for giving the site permission to publish). Authors retain the right to place their work in the public domain, to release it under a copyleft license such as one of those offered by the GNU project or Creative Commons, or to request the removal of their work from the site at some later date.

For a long time, the posting of copyrighted song lyrics and poetry to the site without approval from the copyright holders, while certainly frowned upon, was not actually prohibited. E2 chose to only passively enforce copyright law, in a manner similar to an ISP (for which see OCILLA section 512(c)). This policy changed in August 2003 to a more active one where writeups containing copyrighted material had to either conform to fair use guidelines (length limits, proportion of quoted material to new text) or be posted with permission.

== Rewards ==
The administrators loosely based E2's incentive system on a dual currency system borrowed from many role-playing games. Users may earn experience points ("XP"), which count strictly toward level progress, or convertible currency ("GP"), which may be used to purchase lesser, temporary privileges. Every time a user creates a writeup, he or she earns five XP. Users with at least ten contributed writeups and 500 experience points can vote (up or down) on a writeup. A positive vote grants the writeup's author one experience point while also having a roughly one-third chance of giving one GP to the voter. After voting on a writeup, a noder can see the writeup's "reputation," or number of positive and negative votes (staff do not need to vote in order to see a writeup's reputation). The site's editors may remove writeups that do not meet editorial standards from public view. Authors have the ability to withdraw their own writeups. In both cases the removed writeup is sent to its author's personal "drafts" space, where it may be prepared for re-submission or deleted. The only effect writeup deletion has on the author's account is that the five XP granted for creating the writeup is removed. Writeups deleted before March 2011 are visible to the author on a legacy page called "Node Heaven"; newer or more recently removed items become drafts.

New levels are attained by reaching a predefined, but arbitrary total of XP and writeups, which are given in the FAQ. The system grants special powers at certain experience levels, such as "cool", which rewards the author with 20 XP and sends the writeup to the "cool user picks" column on the front page; the ability to create basic chat rooms on the site; space for uploading a picture to a user's "homenode"; and the ability to hide one's self in the list of logged-in users.

Website views used to be tracked, but due to a glitch this ability was removed. The glitch looped the view counter and crashed the site on more than one occasion.

== Messaging ==
Everything2 provides two communication tools: the Chatterbox and the message system.

The Chatterbox is similar to an IRC channel. It is also nicknamed the catbox. It appears as a panel on the right side of the page that logged-in users can use to read conversations and participate in them. The site's administrators used to have the ability to "borg"—prevent from using the Chatterbox or message system—those users whose behavior violated the unwritten standards of politeness and decorum. This was done through a bot called EDB (short for "Everything Death Borg"), which announced when it had "swallowed" a user. This silencing lasted for five minutes, though persistent trolls were silenced for a longer period—sometimes permanently. As of 2003, the EDB was no longer much used, only making mostly token appearances for humorous effect. Noders who consistently cause trouble (usually by trolling) can be silenced permanently and can be forbidden from noding altogether, though this is rarely done. This would be initiated by a chanops, (A staff member with a + by his or her username that monitors potential abuse ). There is also a utility called 'chatterlight', which provides the chatlog / message buffer with a larger portion of the screen.

The message system lets users send private messages to other users. The messages are stored in the user's mailbox to be read when he or she next logs in. The main use for the message system is giving constructive criticism to the author of a writeup; however, it can be and is used like any medium of private communication. Messages received can be archived or deleted at the receiver's discretion.

== Links ==
=== Hard links ===
Hard links in E2 are simply words or phrases surrounded by [square brackets]. Any words inside square brackets in a writeup will become a link to the E2 node of that title. If a node with that title does not yet exist, following the link will bring up the option to create it.

For the first several years of its existence, E2 did not permit links to third-party web sites in submitted content. In February 2009, a degree of support for linking external URLs was implemented. A hard linked URL will be clearly marked as an external link with the same link icon that Wikipedia uses. Heavy use of external URLs is discouraged as E2 content is expected to stand on its own within a largely self-supportive infrastructure.

=== Pipe links ===
Pipe links are a variant form of hard links. While a hard link to the node Wikipedia would look like [Wikipedia], the pipe link allows the author a greater degree of freedom without restricting what nodes can be linked to. For example, one could write "[Wikipedia|Online encyclopedias] have started to become common sources in my students' research papers." The sentence looks like this to the reader: "Online encyclopedias have started to become common sources in my students' research papers." Rolling over the phrase with the mouse (e.g. "online encyclopedias") shows the hidden content (in this case, "Wikipedia") as the link's title.

Noders can link to a specific writeup within a node by appending (person), (place), (idea) or (thing) to a pipe link. For example, the pipe link [Wiki (thing)|Wiki] links directly to the writeup of the type thing within the Wiki node. If the node contains more than one writeup of the specified type, the pipe link returns a "Duplicates Found" page linking to every writeup of the specified type within the node.

Pipe links on E2 often add "easter egg" content, such as commentary, humor and hidden information.

=== Soft links ===
At the bottom of every node, the system displays up to 64 soft links, though each node can store an unlimited number thereof. "Guest Users"—any viewers not logged in—can see 24, a logged-in user can see up to 48, and the senior administrators ("gods", though this term has fallen out of favour in recent years) can see up to 64. These are two-way links intended to approximate "thought processes", similar in concept to Jason Rohrer's tangle proxy. Whenever a logged-in user moves from one node to another, be it through a hard link, another soft link, or through the title search box, the system creates (or strengthens) the bidirectional soft link between the two; however, some nodes—namely the special pages and the user profiles—will not display the soft links so created. By repeatedly moving from one node to another, users can and do deliberately create and increase the degree of integration of such soft links; some users will use these soft links to make anonymous comments on others' writing. The site's administrators have the ability to remove soft links at their discretion.

=== Firm links ===
Firm links are special, editor-created links that serve to redirect between nodes. Firm links are typically used to link multiple forms of a single name or title to aid searching and ensure that readers find the content that they are seeking. A typical use of firm links would be to permanently link the empty node titled 'USA' to a node titled 'United States of America' that contained writeups about the topic. Alternatively, automatic forwarding can be set up for the same thing, in much the same way as forwards exist on Wikipedia.

== Software ==
E2 is run by the free Everything Engine (ecore), a Perl-based system; its data is stored in a MySQL database.

== Reception ==
=== Media coverage ===
In 2001, The New York Times cited E2 as an example of an emerging class of autonomous, self-organizing sites. A 2001 column in The Japan Times called E2 "awe-inspiring in its expansiveness and depth" and "a Sim City of knowledge management". Writing for Yahoo! Internet Life, Jon Katz cited Everything2 alongside Plastic.com and The Vines Network as an example of "a revolutionary change in media" in 2001. The websites represented "a new kind of bottom-up media in which readers and users—not just editors and producers—set the agenda", safeguarding themselves against elitism or becoming disconnected from their readership "since their readers are defining and participating in content".

A 2005 Washington Post op-ed by university student Claude Willan discussed Everything2 in the context of twentysomething Millennial disaffection. The column began by discussing Borf as a subversive collective identity for culture jamming activities, and used Borf's co-opting into an anonymous collective body as a launching point for a meditation on the Millennial generation's sense that modern society's "images don't relate to us" and "all we can do to make ourselves heard is to twist these images back on themselves." The youthful impulse towards collectivism played out for this generation on the internet, "where identity is automatically annulled" and "anonymity allows collective projects to flourish with no individual gain, only collective gain." Willan gave the "collectivist writing project Everything2.com" as an example of this phenomenon: "run by people you may never meet or talk to, and who specialize in creating fiction or journalism." Willan quoted Everything2 user loquacious defining the site as "a reference collection, a novel that writes itself, poetry that reads itself, and the shiny toy that never grows dull"; for Willan, the elusiveness of Everything2's nature reflected the slipperiness of the Millennial generation's undefinable collective identity.

In 2003, Guardian Unlimited listed E2 as one of the best collaborative encyclopedias on the Web. E2 was nominated for a 2004 Webby Award for Technical Achievement.

=== Academic studies ===
In their study of art in the Internet age, At the Edge of Art, new media scholars Joline Blais and Jon Ippolito discuss Everything2 in the context of the necessity for art to expand its recognition in order to "perform a meaningful role in society", remaining effective by "inviting attention, encouraging new understanding, but resisting full co-optation" to avoid becoming clichéd or banal. They call Everything2 "an exceptionally quirky but highly readable open-source encyclopedia." They draw a contrast between Everything2's XP-driven attention economy encouraging "eccentric or provocative subjects" and Wikipedia's "purely egalitarian" precedent where all visitors can edit articles and "all entries are at the same level"; they also contrast Slashdot's conversational writing that links to external news with Everything2's crafted writing that usually links internally to other Everything2 writeups, which fosters "a focused, if inbred, community."

In The Rhetoric of Cool, new media scholar Jeff Rice views cool from a rhetorical perspective, identifying within cool a variety of constituent rhetorical moves and using this framework to analyze new media. Rice proposes that juxtaposition is one of cool's component rhetorical moves and offers Ted Nelson's concept of hypertext as an example of cool media due to its interlinked, juxtaposed writing. Rice describes Everything2 as a website that most closely resembles Nelson's concept: users forge connections between disparate materials, juxtaposing writings "at the point a pattern (word, concept, idea) appears." Writing on Everything2 never stands alone, always layering over and interacting with other writings, actualizing many aspects of "Nelson's concept of hypertext as a writing space outside of [..] 'the paperdigm'" (Nelson's term for technology that duplicates the writing practices of print culture).

In his study of reputation systems as providers of socializing functions and tools for organizing online communities, Cliff Lampe describes Everything2 as "a compelling example of sociotechnical interactions." Everything2 was one of the first online communities "to implement reputation and rating systems as a means of governing user behavior." The reputation system was initially implemented to improve a user's reputation primarily by the number of writeups the user posted; in practice this incentivized the production of many short, low-quality writeups and led to the community coining the derogatory term "Noding for Numbers". Everything2 responded by revising its reputation system to favor user ratings of writeups over the number of write-ups posted.

== See also ==
- Internet encyclopedia
