= Old Wing Mission =

Historic place in Michigan, United States

- U.S. National Register of Historic Places
- Michigan State Historic Site
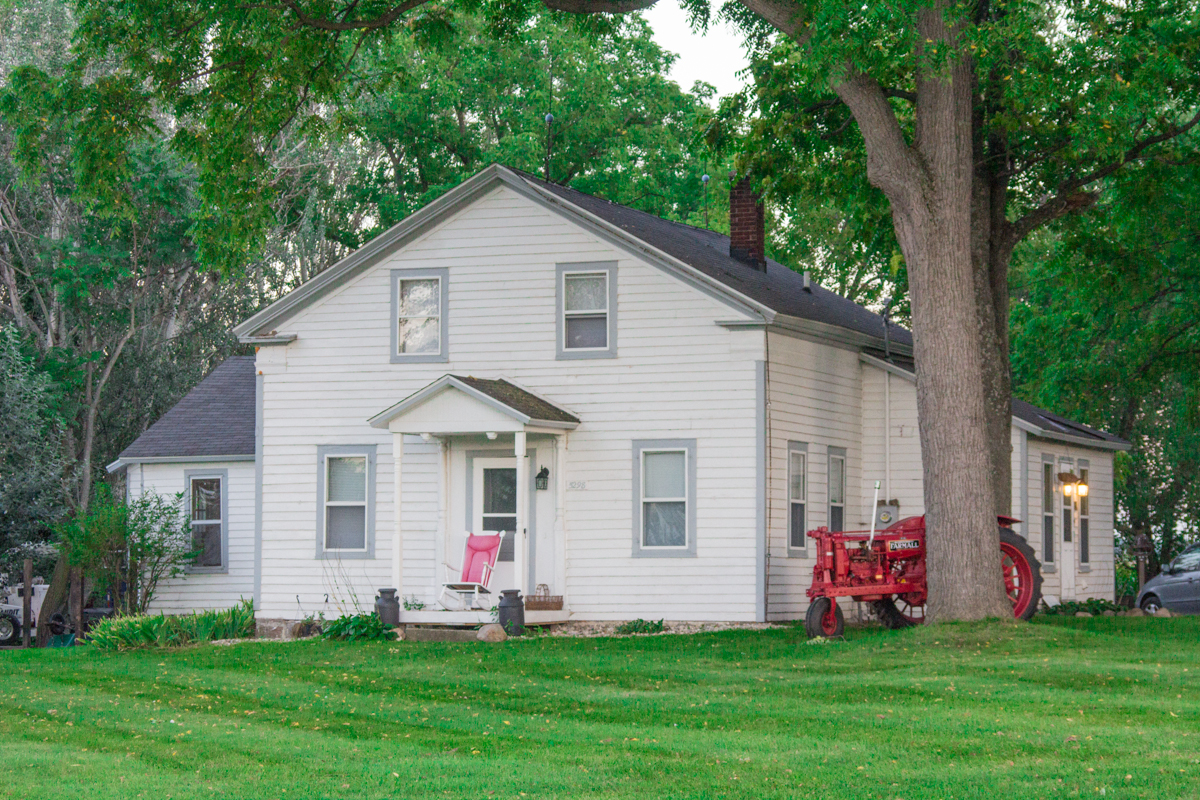

- Location within Michigan Location within the United States
- Interactive map of Old Wing Mission
- Location: 5298 147th Ave., Holland, Michigan
- Coordinates: 42°45′42.2″N 86°4′2.1″W
- Area: 2.3 acres (0.93 ha)
- Built: 1844
- Built by: Isaac Fairbanks, et al.
- Architectural style: Greek Revival
- NRHP reference No.: 86001551
- Added to NRHP: August 13, 1986

Old Wing Mission (also known as Old Wing Inn) is a historic building at 5298 147th Ave. in Holland, Michigan. It is the oldest surviving house in the township.

== History ==
In 1839, Rev. George Smith, a Vermont native, established Christian mission to the local Ottawas at this site. The mission was funded by the Presbyterian Church of Michigan through an Allegan-based Indian mission society. Smith originally built a log cabin for his family near this site. In 1844, local settler Isaac Fairbanks began the construction of this house for Smith. Smith's family moved into the house in 1846.

In 1848 Michigan suffered from a smallpox epidemic that affected the entire community of people. In consideration of the massive influx settlers into the Ottawa County area, Chief Peter Waukazoo and Reverend George Smith decided to move the community as well as the Holland-area Ottawa Mission from Holland up to Northport (on the Leelanau Peninsula) using boats and canoes. Smith abandoned this house; it was purchased a few years later by Isaac Fairbanks. Fairbanks eventually moved into a brick house nearby, and in 1886, Isaac's oldest son, Albert Fairbanks, moved into the place and added a wing onto the house. He added a second wing about 1914. Albert lived here until his death in 1914. His son Austin lived here until his own death in 1950.

The house was then sold to Andrew Vinstra, who modernized the interior. The house was eventually used as a bed and breakfast, known as the Old Wing Inn. The mission building was added to the National Register of Historic Places in 1986 and is currently surrounded by industrial developments. Robert and Carole Pavloski purchased the house in 2003, and as of November 2011 the building was listed for sale.

== Description ==
The Old Wing Mission is a 1-1/2 story end-gable Greek Revival structure, with single-story additions on three sides. The original house is rectangular, measuring 24 feet by 30 feet, clad with clapboards and having plain cornerboards and above a cornice with returns.

On the interior, the original house contained a parlor, bedroom, and kitchen on the first floor and three bedrooms on the second floor. With the c. 1886 addition, the kitchen was turned into a dining room, and the addition housed the new kitchen, a living room, and another bedroom. The 1903 addition houses an office and utility room, and allowed expansion of the dining room. In 1953, the 1886 addition was turned into a separate apartment.
