= Benjamin Van Raalte House =

- U.S. National Register of Historic Places
- Michigan State Historic Site
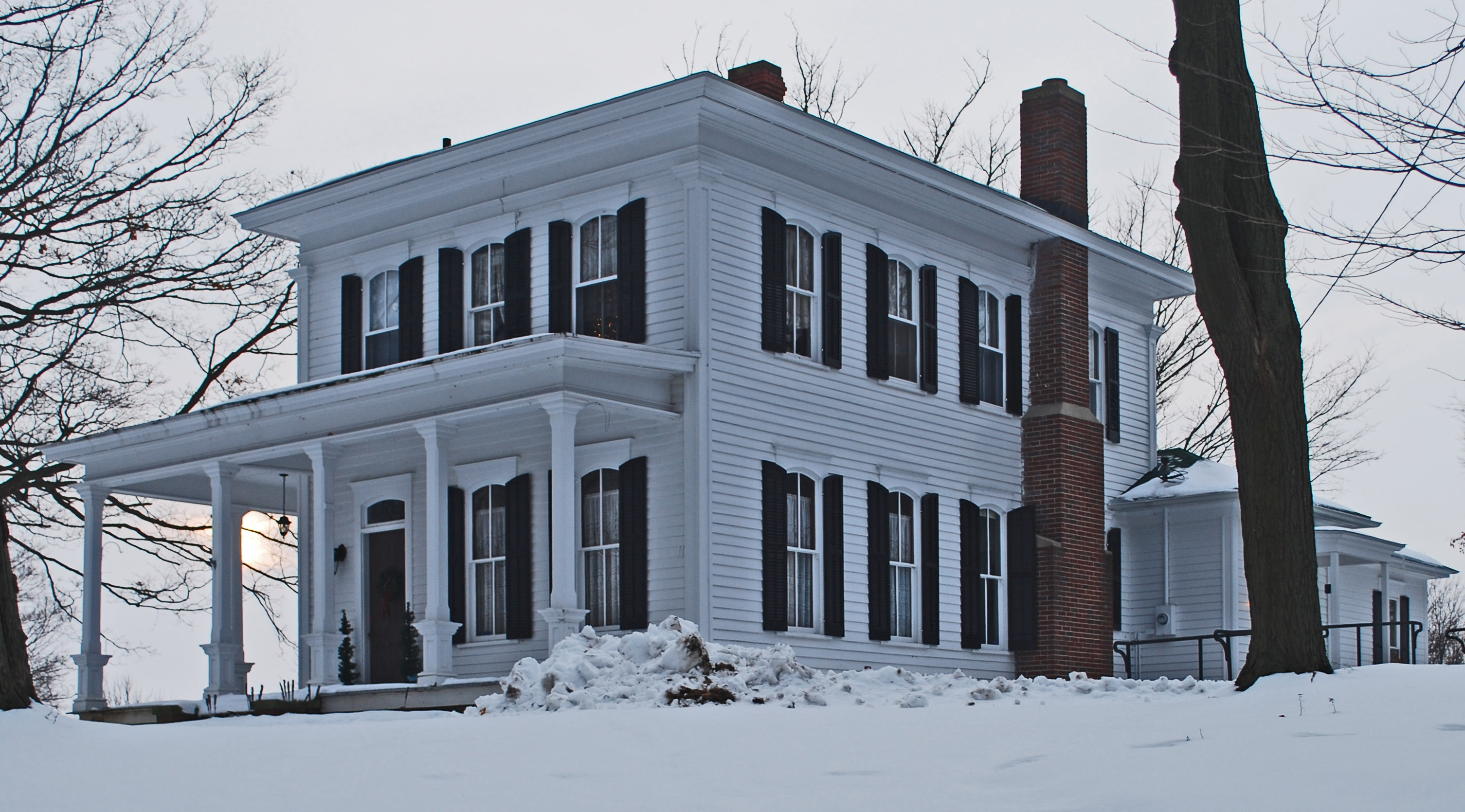

- Location within Michigan Location within the United States
- Interactive map
- Location: 1076 Sixteenth St., Holland, Michigan
- Coordinates: 42°46′53″N 86°3′43″W
- Area: 7 acres (2.8 ha)
- Built: 1867
- Architectural style: Italian Villa
- NRHP reference No.: 89000790
- Added to NRHP: December 4, 1989

The Benjamin Van Raalte House, also known as The Maples, is a private house located at 1076 Sixteenth Street in Holland, Michigan. It was listed on the National Register of Historic Places in 1989. It is one of the last remaining structures associated with the family of the Rev. Albertus C. Van Raalte, who founded Holland in 1847. The house and surrounding property now forms the city of Holland's Van Raalte Farm Park.

== History ==
In 1846, the Rev. Albertus C. Van Raalte led a group of 101 Dutch citizens to America to found a "colony" where they could practice their conservative brand of Dutch Reformed religion. In 1847, the immigrants settled in western Michigan, founding Holland. Benjamin Van Raalte, born in 1840, was Albertus van Raalte's third child. He traveled with his father to the United States in 1846. When he reached adulthood, he began farming the plot of land on this location, which had been conveyed to him by his father.

Benjamin Van Raalte constructed the two barns still on the property in 1865. In 1867, Benjamin Van Raalte had this house constructed, located on a hill overlooking his land.

After Van Raalte's death, his daughter Julia van Raalte and her husband, Orlando S. Reimold, lived in the house. Reimold was an author, and eventually became president and board chairman of the World Book Company. The Reimolds lived primarily in Chicago until Orlando's retirement in 1948, when they moved into this house. Following Julia's death in 1952, Orlando Reimold moved out, and the couple's children then used the house as a country retreat.

In 1983 the Reimolds sold the house and the associated property to the city of Holland. In 1991–99, the city converted the property into a park, known as the Van Raalte Farm. Until 2003, the house was maintained by John and Judy Madison as caretakers. The City of Holland made improvements to the house in 2004, and the DeGraaf Nature Center began using it for various purposes. Further rehabilitation of the house took place in 2016.

On September 21, 2019, the house was fully opened to the public for the first time during the cities annual Civil War muster.

== Description ==
The Benjamin Van Raalte House is a two-story, rectangular Italian Villa house with clapboard siding sitting atop a hill. It has a low hipped roof with projecting eaves and a frieze underneath, encircling the house. Marrow pilasters are at the corners of the house. The front elevation contains an entrance on the left-hand side, with two windows on the right. On the second floor are three evenly spaced windows. Each window is a two-over-two double-hung style, with segmental-arch heads. A single-story hip-roof veranda extends across the front and wraps to one side. A single-story kitchen addition extends from one side at the rear.

On the interior, the front section has a side hall and stair hall, off from which are a front parlor, a dining room, a pantry, and a modern kitchen. The upstairs contains several bedrooms. Furnishings in many of the rooms originally belonged to the Van Raalte family, the most notable of which is a secretary owned by the Rev. Albertus Van Raalte. The kitchen addition now contains an apartment.
