= Calvary Schools of Holland =

Private school in Michigan, US

Coordinates: 42°45′42.9″N 86°08′27.6″W

Information
- Type: Private
- Grades: K-12
- Color(s): Green and White
- Website: http://www.calvaryschoolsholland.org/

Calvary Schools of Holland (CSH) is a private Christian school located in Holland, Michigan. Calvary Schools educates students ranging in age from junior kindergarten to 12th grade at 2 locations. Calvary Schools employs a model of education based on English educator Charlotte Mason. Calvary Schools is a member school of Ambleside Schools International. Calvary Schools is accredited by Accreditation International, the National Council for Private School Accreditation, and the Association of Christian Schools International.

== Academics ==
Calvary Schools became a member of Ambleside Schools International in 2015, which supports and trains schools in the philosophy of English educator Charlotte Mason.

== Campuses ==
Calvary Schools consists of two campuses. Lower and elementary school are housed at Plasman campus. Middle and high school are housed on 40 acres at Laketown campus.

== Officials ==
The current Executive Director/Head of School is Cheryl Ward.
