= John Essebagger Jr. =

United States Army soldier (1928–1951)

- Born: October 29, 1928; Holland, Michigan
- Died: April 25, 1951 (aged 22) near Popsudong, Korea
- Burial place: Pilgrim Home Cemetery, Holland Michigan
- Military career
- Allegiance: United States
- Branch: United States Army
- Service years: 1950–1951
- Rank: Corporal
- Units: Company A, 1st Battalion, 7th Infantry Regiment, 3rd Infantry Division
- Conflicts: Korean War (DOW)
- Awards: Medal of Honor; Purple Heart

John Essebagger Jr. (October 29, 1928 – April 25, 1951) was a soldier in the United States Army during the Korean War who was posthumously awarded the Medal of Honor for his actions on April 25, 1951.

Essebagger joined the army from his birthplace in 1950. He is buried in Pilgrim Home Cemetery, Holland, Michigan.

== Medal of Honor citation ==
Rank and organization: Corporal, U.S. Army, Company A, 7th Infantry Regiment, 3rd Infantry Division

Place and date: Near Popsudong, Korea, April 25, 1951

Entered service at: Holland, Mich. Born: October 29, 1928, Holland, Mich.

G.O. No.: 61, April 24, 1952

Citation:

Cpl. Essebagger, a member of Company A, distinguished himself by conspicuous gallantry and outstanding courage above and beyond the call of duty in action against the enemy. Committed to effect a delaying action to cover the 3d Battalion's withdrawal through Company A, Cpl. Essebagger, a member of 1 of 2 squads maintaining defensive positions in key terrain and defending the company's right flank, had participated in repulsing numerous attacks. In a frenzied banzai charge the numerically superior enemy seriously threatened the security of the planned route of withdrawal and isolation of the small force. Badly shaken, the grossly outnumbered detachment started to fall back and Cpl. Essebagger, realizing the impending danger, voluntarily remained to provide security for the withdrawal. Gallantly maintaining a l-man stand, Cpl. Essebagger raked the menacing hordes with crippling fire and, with the foe closing on the position, left the comparative safety of his shelter and advanced in the face of overwhelming odds, firing his weapon and hurling grenades to disconcert the enemy and afford time for displacement of friendly elements to more tenable positions. Scorning the withering fire and bursting shells, Cpl. Essebagger continued to move forward, inflicting destruction upon the fanatical foe until he was mortally wounded. Cpl. Essebagger's intrepid action and supreme sacrifice exacted a heavy toll in enemy dead and wounded, stemmed the onslaught, and enabled the retiring squads to reach safety. His valorous conduct and devotion to duty reflected lasting glory upon himself and was in keeping with the noblest traditions of the infantry and the U.S. Army.

== Awards and decorations ==

Badge	Combat Infantryman Badge		
1st row	Medal of Honor	Purple Heart	National Defense Service Medal
2nd row	Korean Service Medal with 1 Campaign star	United Nations Service Medal Korea	Korean War Service Medal Retroactively Awarded, 2003
Unit awards	Korean Presidential Unit Citation		

== See also ==
- List of Korean War Medal of Honor recipients
