= Holland Christian Schools =

Private school system in Michigan, United States

Address
- 956 Ottawa Ave. Holland, Ottawa County, Michigan, 49423; United States
- Coordinates: 42°45′46″N 86°07′40″W

District information
- Type: Private School District
- Motto: Equipping minds and nurturing hearts to transform the world for Jesus Christ.
- Grades: K-12
- Superintendent: Eric Forseth
- School board: Holland Christian Board of Trustees
- Chair of the board: Craig Spoelhof

Students and staff
- Colors: Maroon and White

Other information
- Website: https://hollandchristian.org/

Holland Christian Schools is a private Calvinist school system located in Holland, Michigan. The Holland Christian Schools educate students ranging in age from Pre-K through 12th grade.

The school system was established by members of the Christian Reformed Church.

== History ==
By 1963, it had 2,600 students, with each grade level usually ranging in size from 173 to 200 students. Prior to 1965, Zeeland Christian School only had up to junior high school, and referred high school students to Holland Christian. The Zeeland Christian School high school was scheduled to open in 1965.

== Campuses ==
The system operates the following campuses:

Secondary schools

- Holland Christian High School (grades 9–12)
- Holland Christian Middle School (grades 6–8)

Elementary schools

- Rose Park School (grades Preschool-5)
- Pine Ridge School (grades 3–5)
- South Side School (grades Preschool-2)
- Forest School (grades K-2)

== Curriculum ==
The school lifted a ban on teaching the theory of evolution in 1991.

== Operations ==
As of 2017 the yearly tuition ranges from $6,000 to $8,000, and as of that year it gives scholarships to approximately 33% of the student body.

== Culture ==
There are chapel services three times in each instructional week. Circa the 1970s the school had no dances until recent years.

== Notable alumni ==
- Kirk Cousins - Quarterback for the Atlanta Falcons.
- Betsy DeVos - US Secretary of Education (attended all grade levels and graduated from the high school in 1975) - In 2017 Erica L. Green of The New York Times wrote that "The attention brought by Ms. DeVos [...] has put Holland Christian on the defensive in recent months."
- Bill Huizenga - U.S. Congressman.
- Erik Prince - Founder of Blackwater USA
