= Paul Ronald Lambers =

United States Army Medal of Honor recipient (1942–1970)

- Army Medal of Honor
- Born: June 25, 1942; Holland, Michigan, U.S.
- Died: December 1, 1970 (aged 28); Lake Michigan, U.S.
- Burial place: Memorial marker in Graafschap Cemetery, Holland, Michigan
- Military career
- Allegiance: United States of America
- Branch: United States Army
- Service years: 1965–1970
- Rank: Staff sergeant
- Units: 27th Infantry Regiment, 25th Infantry Division
- Wars: Vietnam War
- Awards: Medal of Honor; Bronze Star; Purple Heart

Paul Ronald Lambers (June 25, 1942 – December 1, 1970) was a United States Army soldier and a recipient of the United States military's highest decoration—the Medal of Honor—for his actions in the Vietnam War.

== Biography ==
Lambers joined the Army from his birth city of Holland, Michigan in 1965, and by August 20, 1968, was serving as a Sergeant in Company A, 2nd Battalion, 27th Infantry Regiment, 25th Infantry Division. During a firefight on that day, in Tây Ninh Province, Republic of Vietnam, Lambers took command after the platoon leader was wounded. For his conspicuous leadership during the battle he was promoted to Staff Sergeant and awarded the Medal of Honor in December 1969.

Walking along Lake Michigan two years later in inclement weather, he was swept off a breakwater and drowned at age 28. His body was never recovered.

== Medal of Honor citation ==
Staff Sergeant Lambers' official Medal of Honor citation reads:

"For conspicuous gallantry and intrepidity in action at the risk of his life above and beyond the call of duty. S/Sgt. (then Sgt.) Lambers distinguished himself in action while serving with the 3d platoon, Company A. The unit had established a night defensive position astride a suspected enemy infiltration route, when it was attacked by an estimated Viet Cong battalion.

During the initial enemy onslaught, the platoon leader fell seriously wounded and S/Sgt. Lambers assumed command of the platoon. Disregarding the intense enemy fire, S/Sgt. Lambers left his covered position, secured the platoon radio and moved to the command post to direct the defense.

When his radio became inoperative due to enemy action, S/Sgt. Lambers crossed the fire swept position to secure the 90mm recoilless rifle crew's radio in order to re-establish communications. Upon discovering that the 90mm recoilless rifle was not functioning, S/Sgt. Lambers assisted in the repair of the weapon and directed canister fire at point-blank range against the attacking enemy who had breached the defensive wire of the position.

When the weapon was knocked out by enemy fire, he single-handedly repulsed a penetration of the position by detonating claymore mines and throwing grenades into the midst of the attackers, killing 4 more of the Viet Cong with well aimed hand grenades. S/Sgt. Lambers maintained command of the platoon elements by moving from position to position under the hail of enemy fire, providing assistance where the assault was the heaviest and by his outstanding example inspiring his men to the utmost efforts of courage.

He displayed great skill and valor throughout the 5-hour battle by personally directing artillery and helicopter fire, placing them at times within 5 meters of the defensive position. He repeatedly exposed himself to hostile fire at great risk to his own life in order to redistribute ammunition and to care for seriously wounded comrades and to move them to sheltered positions.

S/Sgt. Lambers' superb leadership, professional skill and magnificent courage saved the lives of his comrades, resulted in the virtual annihilation of a vastly superior enemy force and were largely instrumental in thwarting an enemy offensive against Tây Ninh City. His gallantry at the risk of his life is in keeping with the highest traditions of the military service and reflects great credit upon himself, his unit, and the U.S. Army."

== See also ==
- List of Medal of Honor recipients for the Vietnam War
