= Holland Civic Center =

Coordinates: 42.79°N 86.114°W

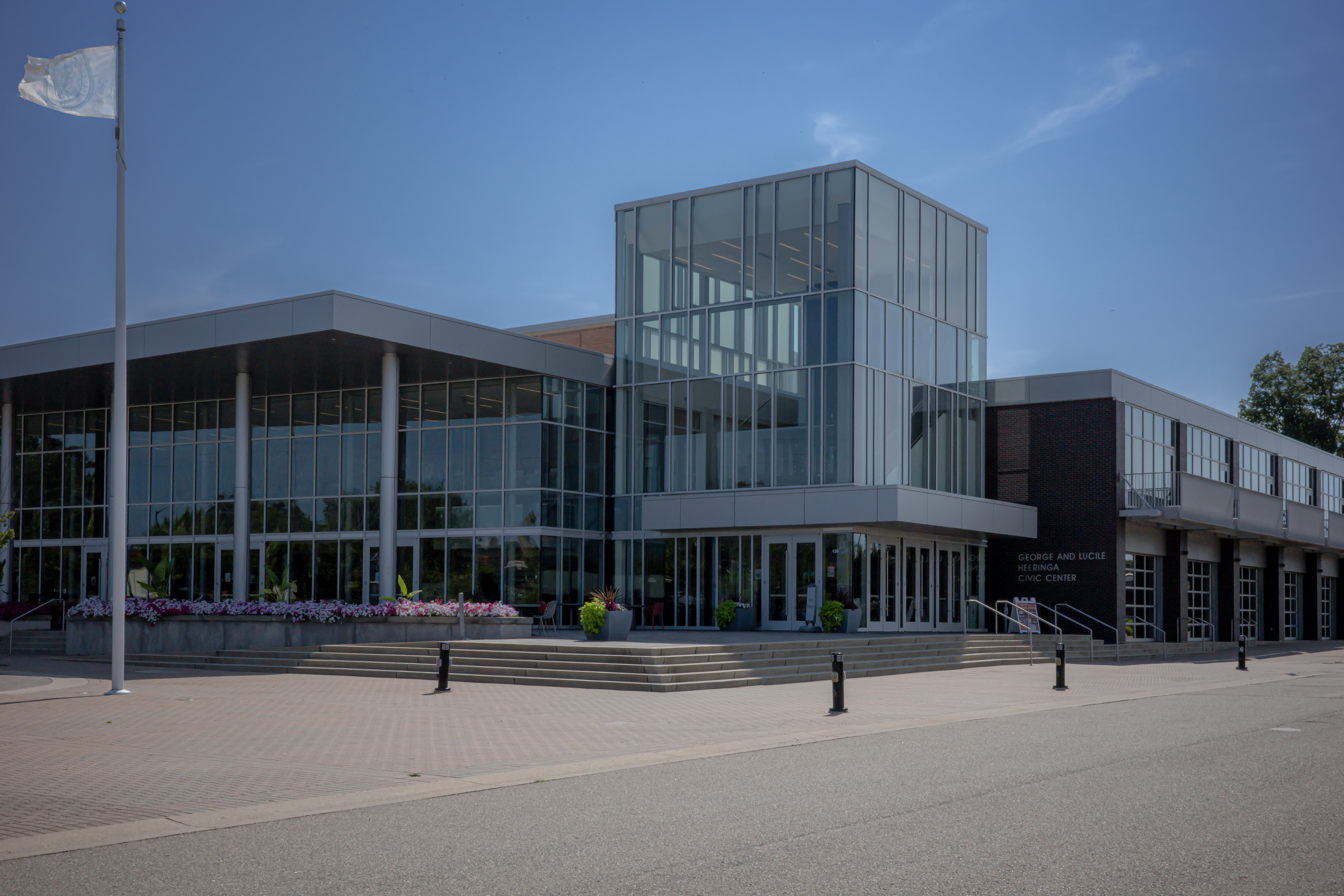
Holland Civic Center in 2025

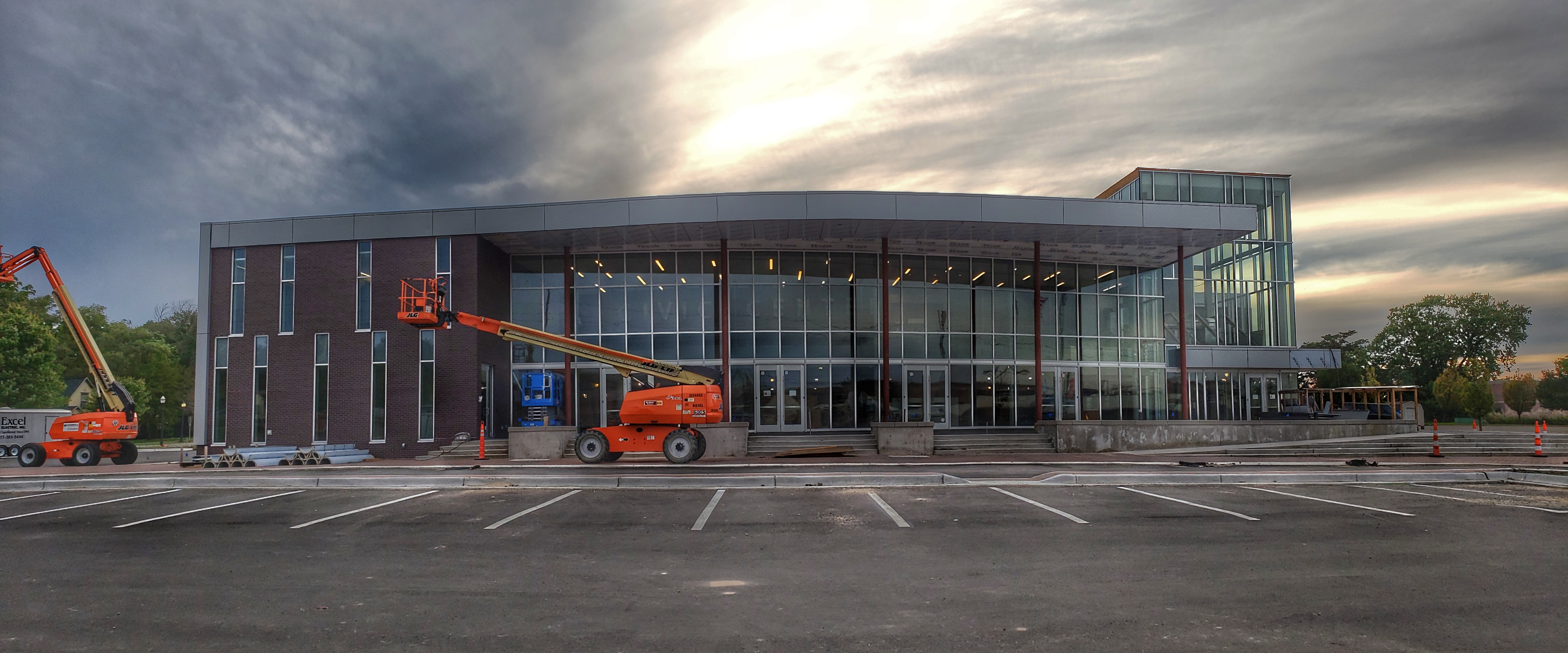
Outside view of the newly renovated Holland Civic Center

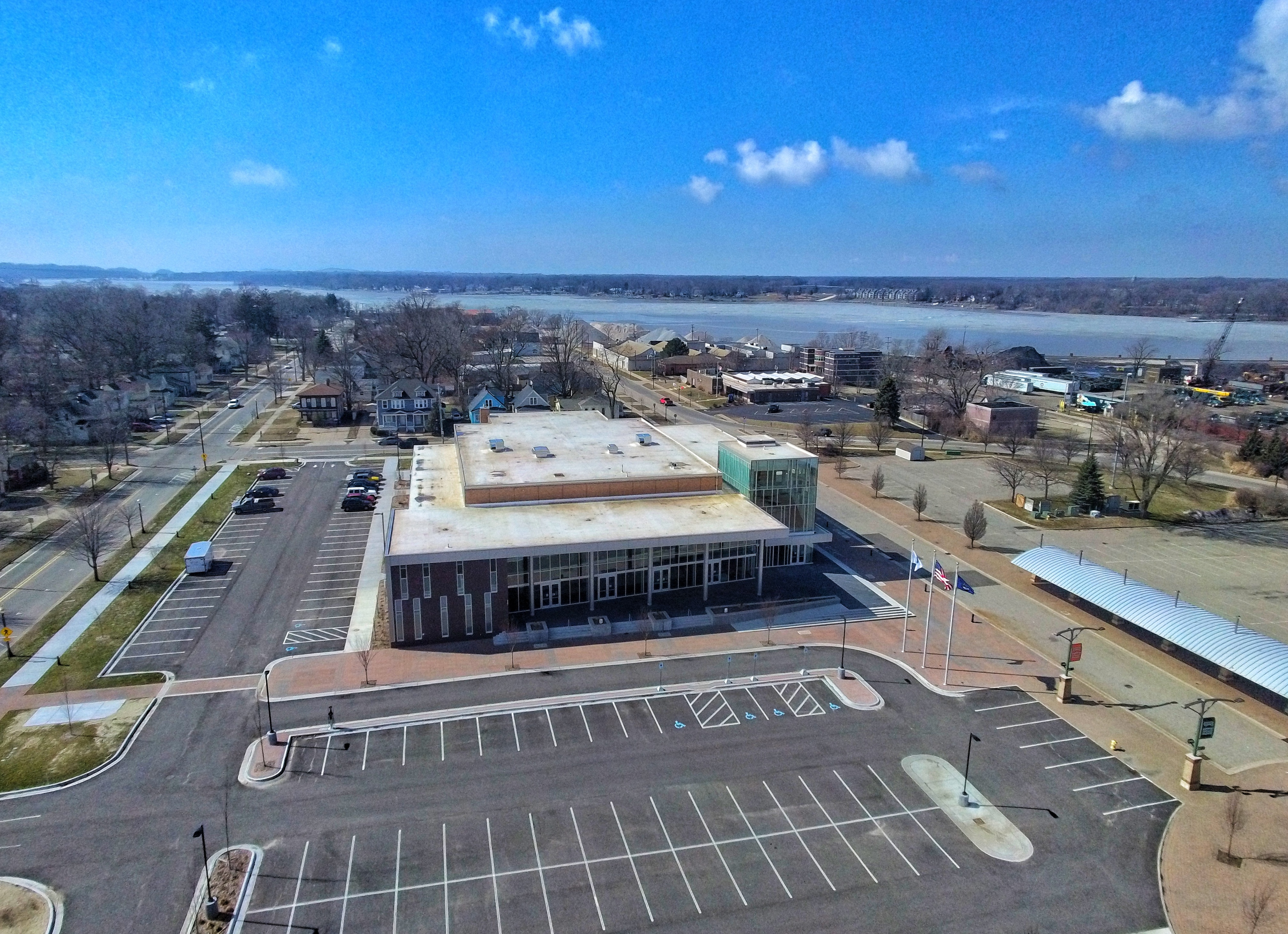
Aerial view of the newly renovated building

The Holland Civic Center Place is a 2,000-seat multi-purpose event center located in Holland, Michigan, United States. It hosts local sporting events, recreation programming, public expos and concerts/live entertainment.
