= Bình Thạnh Đông =

Coordinates: 10°11′N 105°12′E

- Rural commune and village
- Interactive map of Bình Thạnh Đông
- Location in Vietnam
- Country: Vietnam
- Province: An Giang
- Founded: 1979

Area
  - Total: 6.03 sq mi (15.63 km^{2})

Population (2019)
  - Total: 12,683
  - Density: 2,100/sq mi (811/km^{2})
- Time zone: UTC+07:00 (Indochina Time)
- Climate: Aw

Bình Thạnh Đông is a rural commune (xã) and village of An Giang Province, Vietnam.
