= Worsnop =

Worsnop is a surname. Notable people with the surname include:

- Danny Worsnop (born 1990), British musician, singer, songwriter, vocal producer, and actor
- Doug Worsnop (born 1952), American scientist
- Thomas Worsnop (1821–1898), Australian soldier, historian and government official
