= Hope College =

Christian college in Holland, Michigan, US

- Seal of Hope College
- Motto: Spera in Deo (Latin)
- Motto in English: Hope in God
- Type: Private liberal arts college
- Established: 1866; 160 years ago
- Religious affiliation: Reformed Church in America
- Academic affiliations: Space-grant
- Endowment: $325 million (2025)
- President: Matthew A. Scogin
- Provost: Gerald Griffin
- Administrative staff: 550
- Undergraduates: 3,372 (Fall 2026)
- Location: Holland, Michigan, U.S. 42°47′13″N 86°6′8″W
- Campus: 125 acres (51 ha); Suburban
- Colors: Orange and blue
- Nicknames: Flying Dutchmen; Flying Dutch
- Sporting affiliations: NCAA Division III—MIAA
- Mascot: Dutch
- Website: www.hope.edu

Hope College is a private Christian liberal arts college in Holland, Michigan, United States. Dutch immigrants originally opened it in 1851 as the Pioneer School, four years after the community was first settled. The first freshman college class matriculated in 1862, and Hope received its state charter in 1866. Hope College is affiliated with the Reformed Church in America and retains a Christian atmosphere. Its 120-acre (49 ha) campus is adjacent to the downtown commercial district and has been shared with Western Theological Seminary since 1884. The Hope College campus is near the eastern shores of Lake Michigan.

== History ==
Hope's motto is taken from Psalm 42:6: "Spera in Deo" ("Hope in God"). The college's emblem is an anchor. This is drawn from a speech by Albertus van Raalte, the leader of the community, on the occasion of the Pioneer School's founding: "This is my anchor of hope for this people in the future" (an allusion to Hebrews 6:19). The primary-level Pioneer School later expanded to secondary and college-level education as Hope College. Van Vleck Hall, which originally housed the Pioneer School, is the oldest building on campus (1858) and serves as a dormitory. It is the city's second-oldest building. The college admitted its first female students in 1878.

2015 marked Hope College's 150th year of education. The celebration began with the 150th commencement on May 3, 2015. The year held two grand openings, the Kruizenga Art Museum and the Jack H. Miller Center for Musical Arts, and the groundbreaking ceremony of the Jim and Martie Bultman Student Center.

A marker designating the college as a Michigan Historic Site was erected in 2019 by the Michigan Historical Commission. The inscription reads:

In 1851, four years after settlers from the Netherlands founded Holland, the Pioneer School was established to meet some of the educational needs of the young colony. This school, the predecessor of Hope College, received direction and financial support from the General Synod of the Reformed Church in America. The school evolved into the Holland Academy, which in 1862 enrolled its first college class. On May 14, 1866, the institution was chartered as Hope College, and on July 17, 1866, the first class of eight students was graduated. The college’s name, seal, and motto are derived from a statement of the founder of Holland, Rev. Albertus C. Van Raalte, who said of the Pioneer School, "This is my Anchor of Hope for this people in the future." In the decades that followed, a strong college of arts and sciences was developed which continues to serve the church and the community.

=== Presidents ===
The following people have presided over the college:

1. Philip Phelps Jr. (1866–1878)
2. Charles Scott (1878–1893)
3. Gerrit J. Kollen (1893–1911, Hope College Class of 1868)
4. Ame Vennema (1911–1918, Hope College Class of 1879)
5. Edward D. Dimnent (1918–1931, Hope College Class of 1896)
6. Wynand Wichers (1931–1945)
7. Irwin J. Lubbers (1945–1963, Hope College Class of 1917)
8. Calvin A. VanderWerf (1963–1970, Hope College Class of 1937)
9. Gordon VanWylen (1972–1987)
10. John H. Jacobson (1987–1999)
11. James E. Bultman (1999–2013, Hope College Class of 1963)
12. John C. Knapp (2013–2017)
13. Dennis N. Voskuil (2017–2019, interim)
14. Matthew A. Scogin (2019–present, Hope College Class of 2002)

== Hope Forward ==
Hope Forward is a program that allows students to receive gifted tuition. Instead of paying up front, students may support future students through donations after they graduate.

Hope Forward has gained national attention, including in the June 2023 episode of Malcolm Gladwell's Revisionist History podcast, "A Good Circle", which highlights this model's potential to transform higher education.

== Academics ==
Admissions statistics
- 2023 entering class
- Admit rate: 80%

Test scores middle 50%^{[i]}
- SAT Total: 1120-1330
- ACT Composite: 24-31

Academic rankings

Liberal arts
- U.S. News & World Report: 84

Master's
- Washington Monthly: 116

Hope College offers 90+ majors, all of which lead to a Bachelor of Arts, Bachelor of Music, Bachelor of Science, Bachelor of Science in Engineering, or Bachelor of Science in Nursing degree. It has a student population of about 3,200, with a student-to-faculty ratio of 11:1.

The college offers off-campus study programs in several cities, including Los Angeles, Washington, D.C., and Chicago, and overseas programs for the summer, semester, or an academic year. Among its international programs, a longstanding summer semester in Vienna is popular among students.

Hope College is a member of the Great Lakes College Association.

In the 2025 U.S. News & World Report ranking of schools by undergraduate research and creative projects, Hope College ranks #22. Hope also ranks #84 in the National Liberal Arts category.

Courses offered at Hope are divided into five disciplines:

- General Education: In General Education courses students encounter a diverse array of topics rooted in the liberal arts education. Regardless of their majors, students take courses in art, history, language, literature, math and sciences. They also participate in a First-Year Seminar course and a Senior Seminar course. These courses were developed to help transition students in and out of their college career.
- Arts and Humanities: The Fine and Performing Arts degree at Hope College consists of four departments, which include Art and Art History, Dance, Music and Theatre. The Humanities division includes the departments of English, History, Modern and Classical Language, Philosophy and Religion.
- Natural and Applied Sciences: The Natural and Applied Sciences programs include Biology, Biochemistry and Molecular Biology, Chemistry, Computer Science, Engineering, Geological and Environmental Sciences, Mathematics, Neuroscience, Nursing and Physics.
- Social Sciences: A Social Science degree consists of the departments of Communication, Economics and Business, Education, Kinesiology, Peace and Justice minor, Political Science, Psychology and Sociology/Social Work.
- Pre-health programs: There are a wide variety of pre-health programs at the undergraduate level. They include Chiropractic Medicine, Dentistry, Genetic Counseling, Medicine, Occupational Therapy, Optometry, Pharmacy, Physician Assistant, Physical Therapy, Podiatry, Public Health, Speech Language Pathology and Veterinary Medicine. Other pre-health professions include Nursing, Athletic Training, and Pre-clinical Psychology.

Hope's most popular majors, in terms of 202 graduates, were:

- Business
- Psychology
- Engineering
- Nursing
- Exercise Science
- Communication
- Biology
- Education
- Social Work
- Political Science

=== Accreditation ===
Hope College is accredited by the Higher Learning Commission.

== Campus life ==
=== Housing ===
Hope College campus

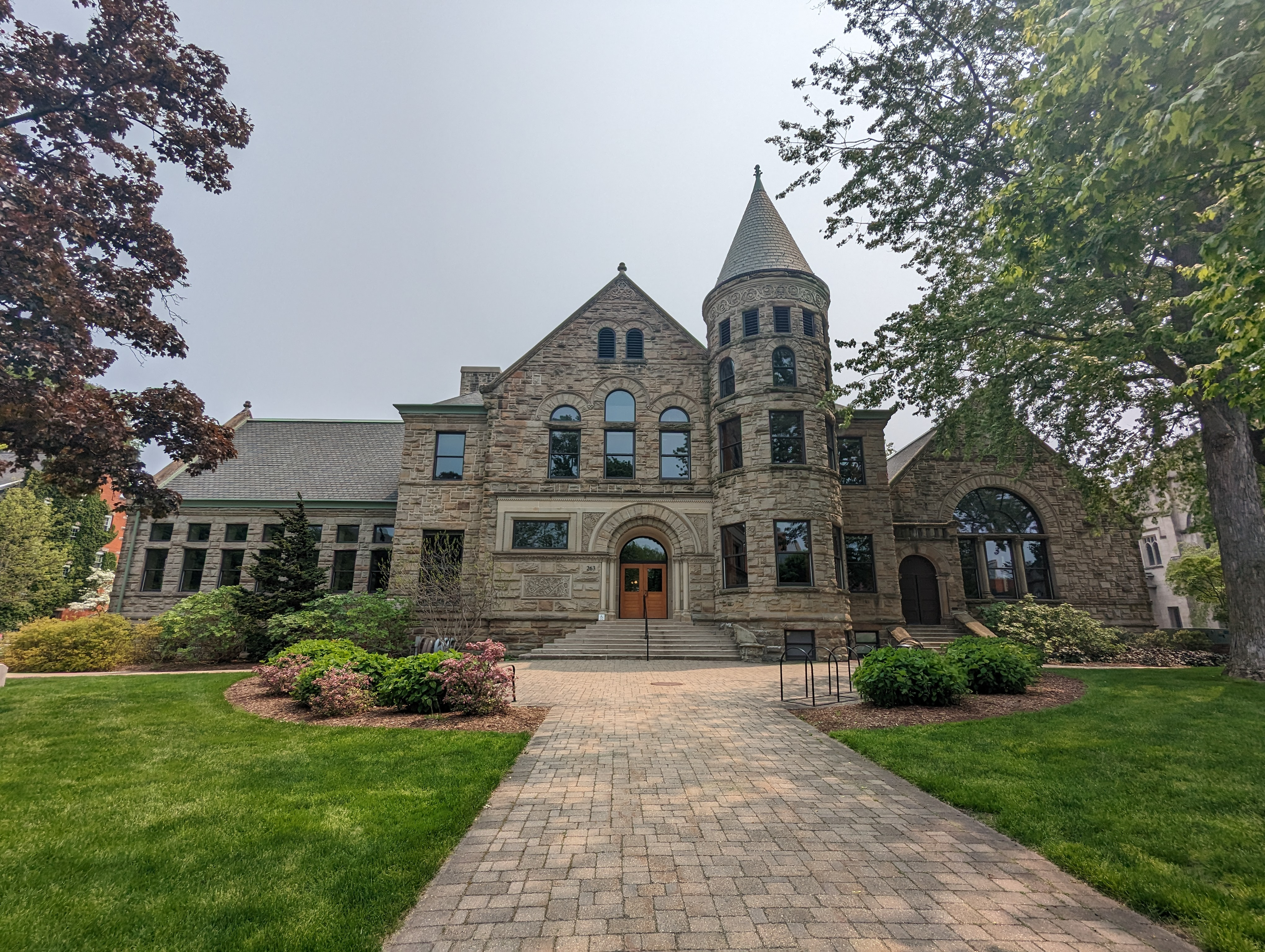
Graves Hall

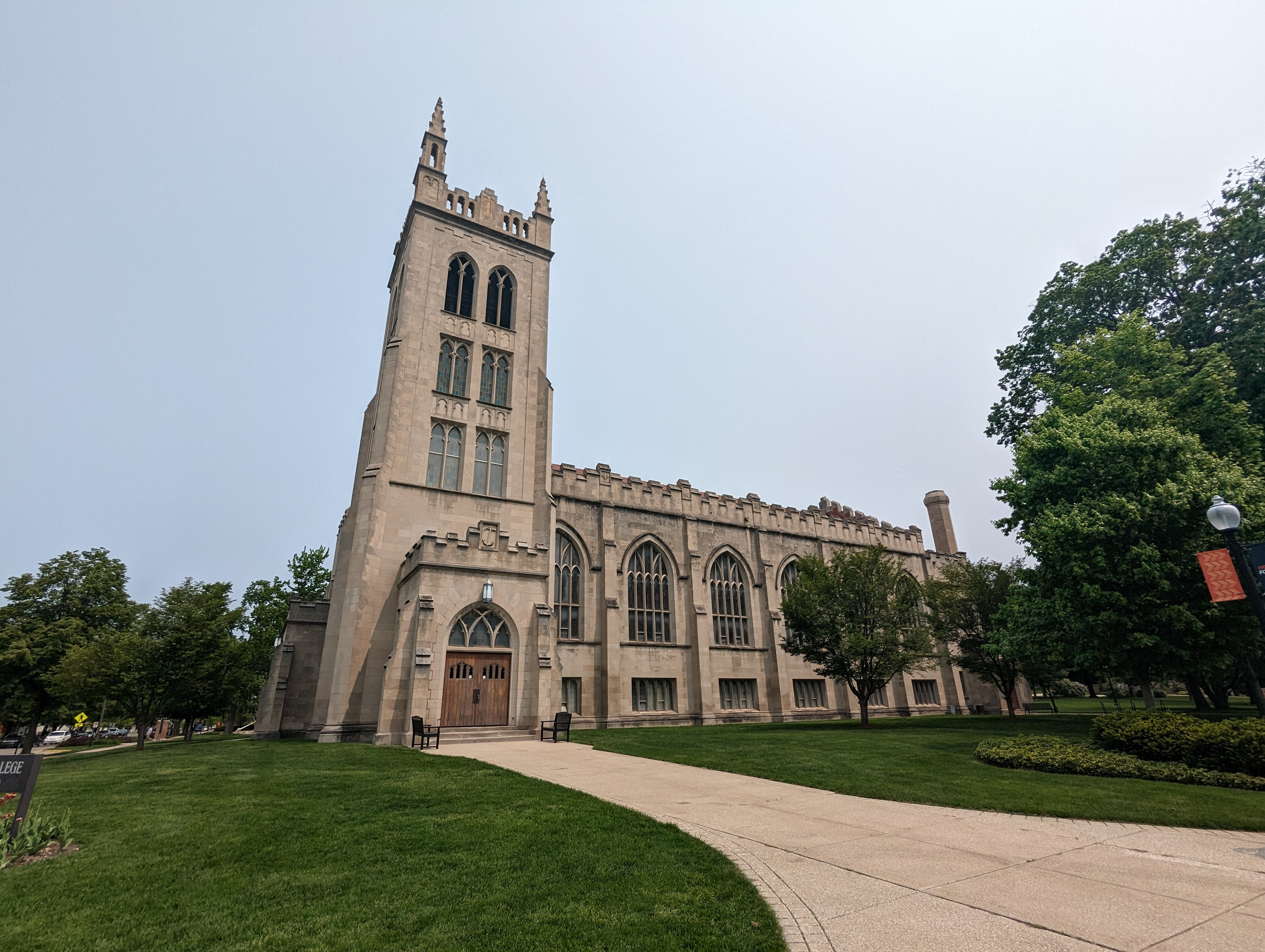
Dimnent Memorial Chapel

On-campus housing is provided in 11 residence halls, 24 apartment buildings, and 70+ houses (called "cottages") that the college owns near the campus. A small percentage of students—primarily juniors, seniors, and Holland, Michigan residents—live off-campus. All full-time students without commuter status are required to live in on-campus housing for three years.

=== Student organizations ===
The college offers 80 student-led clubs and organization such as Dance Marathon and Relay for Life, an FM radio station (WTHS), newspaper (The Anchor), literary magazine (Opus), and yearbook (Milestone), plus a variety of academic, musical, spiritual, literary, social and athletic clubs. About 10–12% of students belong to social fraternities and sororities, which are local to Hope rather than chapters of larger organizations, with the exception of one fraternity, Phi Sigma Kappa. Hope also houses the 6th oldest fraternity that is still in existence, Omicron Kappa Epsilon. The college holds Sunday evening worship services ("The Gathering") and Monday/Wednesday/Friday Chapel services on campus. Attendance at these events has been voluntary since 1970, yet students routinely fill Dimnent Memorial Chapel to its capacity of greater than 1,000 students at each service.

=== The Pull ===
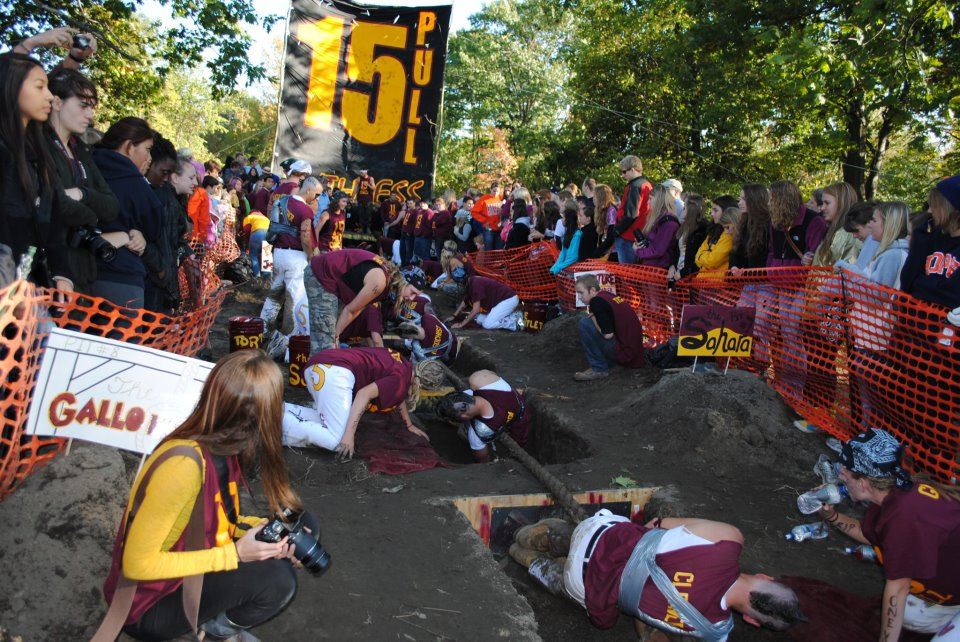
A view of the Odd year side at the 114th pull

"The Pull" is an annual tug-of-war between the freshman and sophomore classes at Hope College, dating to 1898.

=== The Nykerk Cup Competition ===
The Nykerk Cup Competition is a multifaceted tradition between freshmen and sophomore women involving song, play, and oration. Junior and senior coaches arrange the music, write the plays, and guide the orators as they craft seven-minute monologues. Men participate in the competition as "moralers" by supporting the participants while building sets and coordinating scene changes. The tradition was started in 1936 by John Nykerk, Hope professor and founder of the college’s music department.

=== Dance Marathon ===
The students of Hope College hold the annual Dance Marathon to raise money for Children's Miracle Network Hospitals, particularly Helen DeVos Children's Hospital in Grand Rapids. This event takes place in the spring semester. Students volunteer to be dancers or moralers for the event. The “Dream Team” leadership board is composed of four student directors and various student leaders chairing committees such as hospital relations, decorations, publicity, finance, and catering. Dancers stand on their feet and dance for 24 hours while moralers take shifts supporting the dancers. Children of the hospital and their families often visit to show their thanks and share their stories of resilience and hope. To date, Hope College Dance Marathon has raised over $4 million for Helen Devos Children’s Hospital in the last 24 years.

=== Christmas Vespers ===
Each December, Hope College hosts a musical Christmas service in Dimnent Chapel. The service has been held annually since 1941 and features over 200 students, staff and faculty. It includes music performed by the Chapel Choir, College Chorus, Orchestra, and small ensembles. There are usually two to three performances each year, all of which draw a crowd that fills the chapel. The event is regularly recorded and televised on PBS stations during the Christmas season.

== Campus renovation ==
The college marked the completion of the "Greater Hope" campaign in October 2015 with the dedication of the Jack H. Miller Center for Musical Arts. In September 2015, the college dedicated the opening of Kruizenga Art Museum, designed by C Concept Design, and broke ground on construction of the Jim and Martie Bultman Student Center.

As of October 2015, the Jack H. Miller Center for Musical Arts and the Kruizenga Art Museum are open and in use by students and faculty. The Jim and Martie Bultman Student Center opened for the 2017–2018 school year.

The Jim and Eileen Heeringa Dance Wing addition and Dow Center renovations, opened in fall of 2024, provide a dedicated performance space, expand wellness facilities, maintain arts accreditation and foster professional partnerships for Hope’s dance and theatre departments.

On October 17, 2025, Hope College broke ground on the construction of a 74,000-square-foot building to house the Department of Economics and Business. The project is estimated to cost $65 million with an estimated completion in 2028.

== Athletics ==
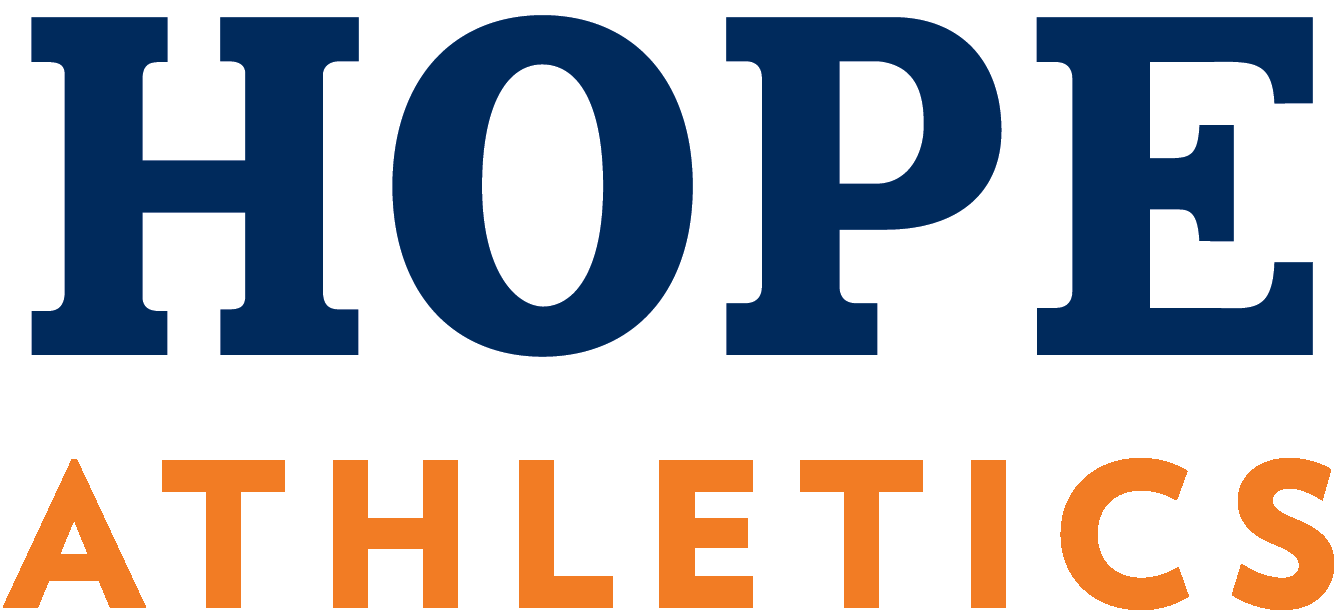
Hope athletics wordmark

Hope College competes in the MIAA conference, and is a Division III member of the NCAA. It fields 20 men's and women's varsity teams.

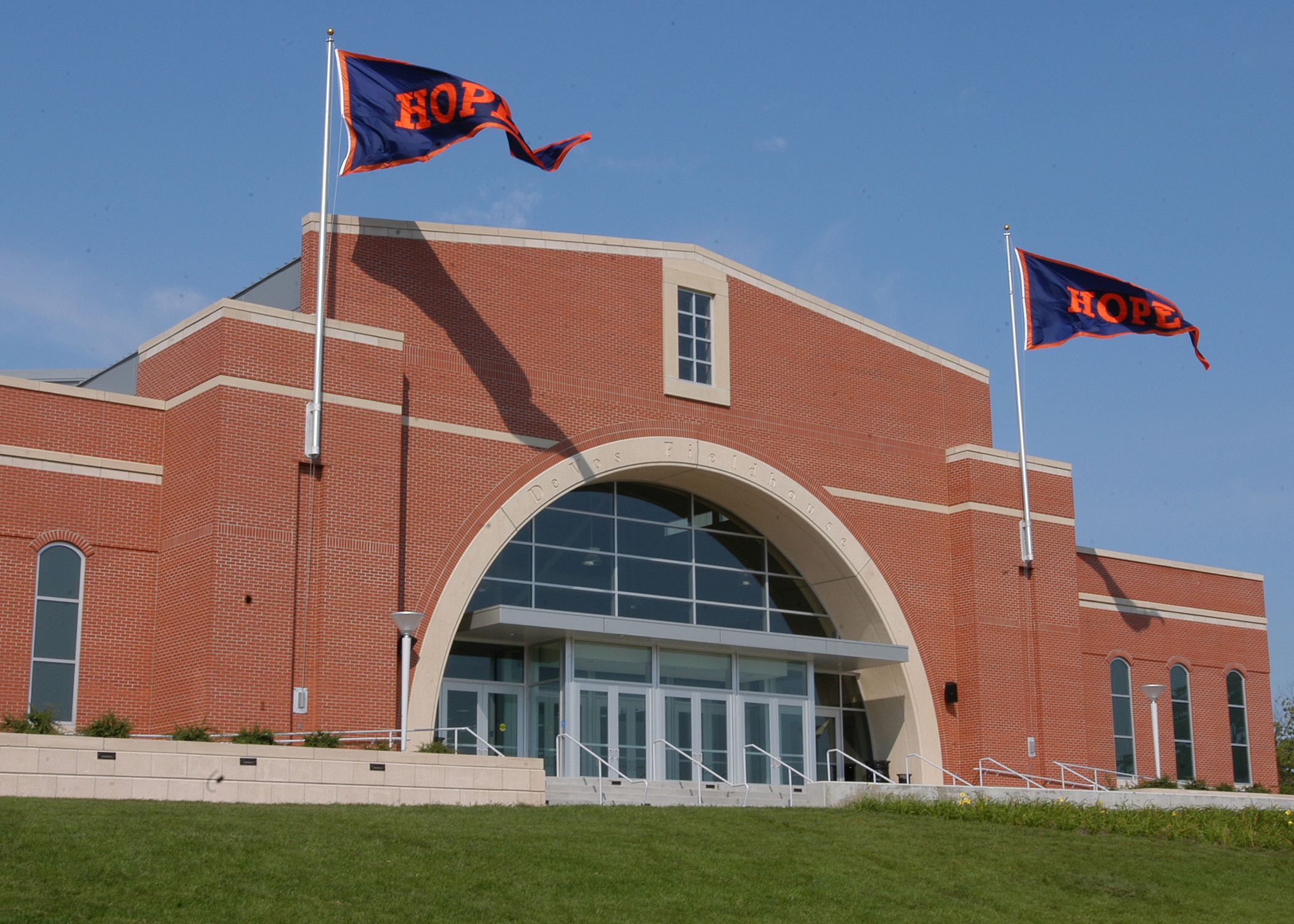
DeVos Fieldhouse, home to Hope basketball and volleyball teams

The college has constructed several new outdoor athletic venues in recent years—Jim Heeringa Athletic Center (2021) DeVos Fieldhouse (2005, home to basketball and volleyball teams), Boeve Baseball Stadium (2008), Wolters Softball Stadium (2008), Van Andel Soccer Stadium (2009) and Heeringa-Vande Poel Tennis Stadium (2012).

Hope has won the MIAA All-Sports/Commissioner's Cup Championship more than any other member school. The college has won the honor a league-leading 34 times. In 2012–2013 Hope athletes and/or teams qualified for nine NCAA championships.

The school's athletic teams are called the Flying Dutchmen (men) and the Flying Dutch (women). The school colors are blue and orange (possibly chosen because the Dutch royal family is the House of Orange-Nassau). The college sponsors club ice hockey and rugby in addition to a popular intramural sports program.

=== National championships ===
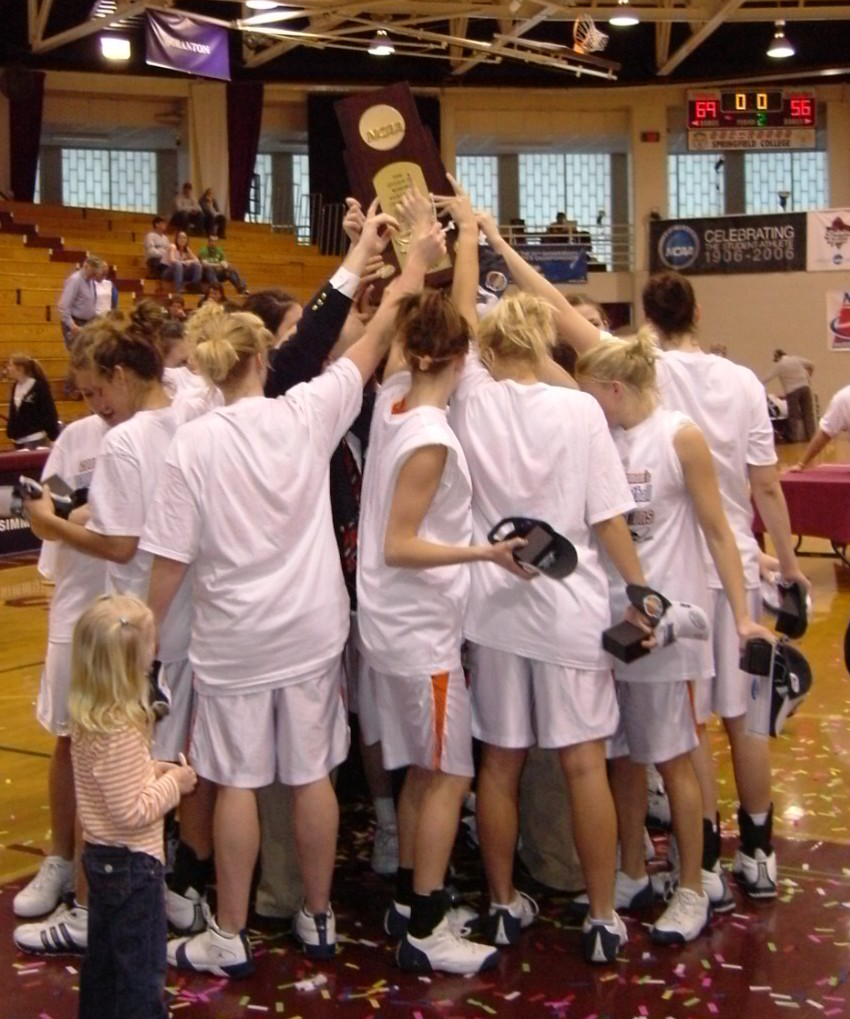
Hope women's team celebrate after winning the 2006 national championship

Year	Sport	Assoc/Div.
1990	Women's basketball	NCAA Division III
2006	Women's basketball	NCAA Division III
2014	Women's volleyball	NCAA Division III
2022	Women's basketball	NCAA Division III

==== Club team national championships ====
- 2018: Men's ice hockey (ACHA Division 3)
- 2021: Men's ice hockey (ACHA Division 3)
- 2022: Men's ice hockey (ACHA Division 3)

== Notable people ==
=== Alumni and former students ===
Notable alumni and former students of Hope College include:

==== Arts and media ====
- John Dinkeloo, architect and engineer
- Emily Henry, New York Times-bestselling novelist
- Tim Laman, wildlife photojournalist and filmmaker
- Milton J. Nieuwsma, author, Emmy-winning screenwriter and producer
- Saša Petricic, journalist and television correspondent
- Sufjan Stevens, singer-songwriter
- Kim Zimmer, actress and four-time Daytime Emmy Award winner

==== Business and technology ====
- Jeff Bates, co-founder of Slashdot
- Max DePree, writer, industrialist, and former CEO of Herman Miller
- Robert W. Haack, banker and former president of the New York Stock Exchange
- John Hendrickson, former chairman, president, and CEO of Perrigo
- Rob Malda, co-founder of Slashdot
- Theodore O. Yntema, economist

==== Government, law, and military ====
- Dave Brat, former U.S. representative
- John R. Dethmers, former chief justice of the Michigan Supreme Court
- Gerrit J. Diekema, former U.S. representative and speaker of the Michigan House of Representatives
- Pete Hoekstra, former U.S. ambassador to the Netherlands and Canada
- Terri Lynn Land, former Michigan Secretary of State
- Wendell Alverson Miles, U.S. federal judge
- John Moolenaar, U.S. representative
- Craig Morford, former United States Deputy Attorney General
- Thomas J. Plewes, former chief of the United States Army Reserve
- Lynne Stewart, defense attorney
- Nancy Torresen, U.S. district judge
- Carol van Voorst, former U.S. ambassador to Iceland
- Guy Vander Jagt, former U.S. representative
- Annette Ziegler, justice of the Wisconsin Supreme Court

==== Science, medicine, and academia ====
- Rychard Bouwens, astronomer at Leiden University
- Sylvia T. Ceyer, chemist and professor at the Massachusetts Institute of Technology
- Gary M. Hieftje, analytical chemist and distinguished professor at Indiana University
- Donald Kroodsma, ornithologist and author
- Willis J. Potts, pediatric surgeon who pioneered cardiac surgery for children
- Larry Siedentop, political philosopher and historian at the University of Oxford
- Richard Smalley, Nobel Prize-winning chemist
- Morris Steggerda, physical anthropologist and geneticist
- Eugene van Tamelen, organic chemist at Stanford University
- George Vande Woude, cancer researcher who discovered the MET oncogene
- Maurice Visscher, cardiovascular physiologist
- Doug Worsnop, atmospheric chemist

==== Religion and activism ====
- M. R. DeHaan, physician and Bible teacher
- Kevin DeYoung, theologian, author, and pastor
- A. J. Muste, pacifist, labor organizer, and civil rights activist
- Clark V. Poling, U.S. Army chaplain and one of the Four Chaplains
- Robert Schuller, televangelist and founder of the Crystal Cathedral
- Samuel Marinus Zwemer, missionary and scholar of Islam

==== Sports ====
- Jim Kaat, Baseball Hall of Fame pitcher
- Doc Lavan, Major League Baseball player
- D. J. Reyburn, Major League Baseball umpire
- Ron Schipper, football coach and member of the College Football Hall of Fame
- George F. Veenker, college football and basketball coach and athletic director

=== Faculty and staff ===
- Susan Atefat-Peckham, poet and winner of the National Poetry Series; assistant professor of English, 1999–2002
- Meredith Blackwell, mycologist and former president of the International Mycological Association; assistant professor of biology, 1975–1981
- Dave Brandt, soccer coach who won six NCAA Division III national championships at Messiah; Hope men's soccer coach, 2018–2021
- Miguel A. De La Torre, theologian and ethicist; professor of religion at Hope
- James A. Herrick, scholar of rhetoric and author; professor of communication at Hope, 1984–2020
- Charles A. Huttar, literary scholar known for work on C. S. Lewis and the Inklings; professor of English at Hope, 1966–1996
- Susan Ipri-Brown, mechanical engineer and president of the American Society of Mechanical Engineers; former Hope engineering professor and director of ExploreHope
- James Kennedy, historian of the Netherlands; Hope history professor and Van Raalte Institute research fellow, 1997–2005
- John C. Knapp, academic administrator and author; president of Hope College, 2013–2017
- David Myers, social psychologist and author of widely used psychology textbooks; longtime Hope psychology professor
- William Pannapacker, scholar and higher-education writer; professor of English at Hope, 2000–2023
- John Pattnot, swimming coach and exercise physiologist; three-time NCAA Division III national coach of the year and longtime Hope professor and coach
- Patrice Rankine, classical scholar; former Hope dean for the arts and humanities and professor of classics
- Jack Ridl, poet; professor of English at Hope, 1971–2006, and namesake of the college's Jack Ridl Visiting Writers Series
- Cady Short-Thompson, academic administrator; former Hope provost and professor of communication
- Ray Smith, former CFL player, football coach, professor, and athletic director; Hope head football coach, 1970–1994

== See also ==
- Murder of Janet Chandler
