= The Hope College Pull =

Annual tug-of-war contest in Holland, Michigan

The Pull
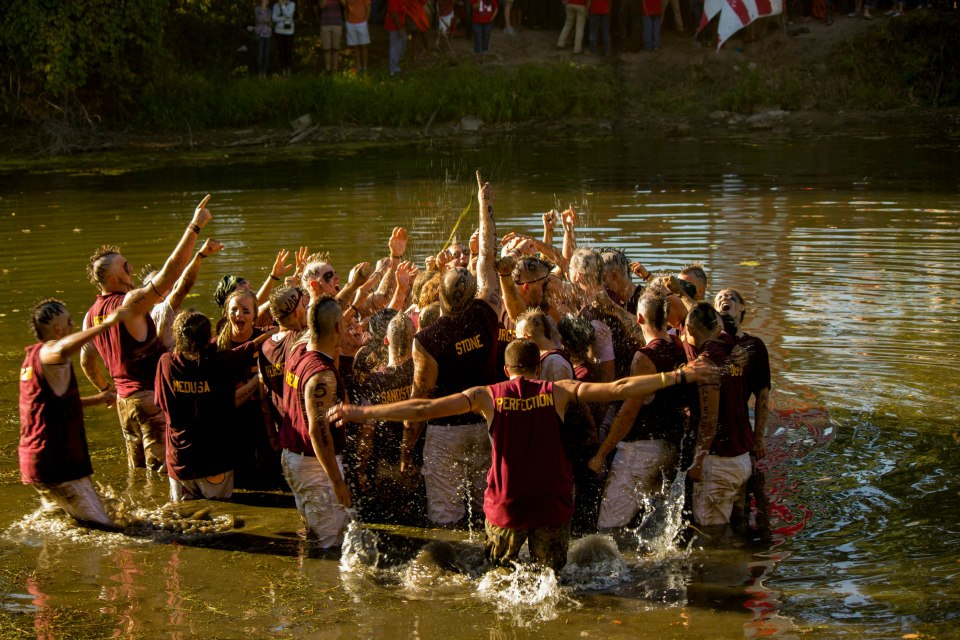
- The 15 Pull Team swims to celebrate winning the 2012 Pull.
- Status: active
- Genre: tug-of-war competition
- Frequency: annually
- Location: Holland, Michigan
- Inaugurated: 1898
- Organiser: Hope College

The Hope College Pull (The Pull) is an annual tug-of-war contest in Holland, Michigan on the fourth Saturday after Labor Day at 3:00 PM. It is sponsored by Hope College and is one of the nation's oldest standing college traditions. Starting in 1910 it was held across the Black River, but in 2019 the location moved onto campus. Competitors are 40 members of both the Freshman and Sophomore Class. The freshman team is coached by juniors while the sophomore team is coached by seniors. Each Pull Team is named for the graduating year of that class. For example, the 19 (pronounced one-nine) Pull Team was composed entirely of students expected to graduate in 2019, plus the coaches expected to graduate in 2017. Teams that graduate on even years are Even Year Pull Teams, whereas those who graduate on odd years are Odd Year Pull Teams.

== History ==
The first record of The Pull is a brief mention of a tug-of-war in Hope's newspaper, "The Anchor", in 1898. The first Pull with a recorded victor was in 1909. There is no recorded history of The Pull—or "the tug" as it was then called—between those years. The Pull was cancelled in 1918, 1943, and 1944 because of the First and Second World Wars. The Pull was cancelled once again in 2020 due to the Covid-19 pandemic. Methods of pulling have shifted greatly over the years. Pictures as early as 1927 show Pullers in pits similar to the way they look now, however pits were not consistent practice until the 1960s

The precise strategy used from year-to-year changes fairly often, especially call sets (the strategies by which the Pull Team uses to move in a synchronized manner). A new method is often desired to gain an edge over the opponent. There was a draw in 1916. In 1926, The Pull was again called a draw, and was settled by a basketball game, which the sophomore class of 1929 won. A third draw was called in 1952. 1956 saw the shortest Pull at 2 minutes and 40 seconds. The following year, 1957, The Pull was cancelled due to a campus-wide flu epidemic. The longest Pull was held in 1977 and lasted 3 hours and 51 minutes, to be called a draw. This was the last draw called. Following that year's Pull, the rules were re-written, capping the time to 3 hours. The rope is measured at the 3 hour mark in order to determine the winner. The shortest Pull since the rule update was in 2008 when the 11 Pull Team took 71 feet of rope from the 12 Pull Team in only 67 minutes. The following year, the 12 Pull Team took a record 82 feet, 6 inches from the 13 Pull Team in 69 minutes. In 2013 and 2023 new ropes were purchased. In 2014 the 17 Pull team broke the all-time record for The Pull by taking 90 ft 4 in of rope from the freshman 18 team.

== Rope Run and Pull Day ==
The day before the event, Pullers dig the pits they will compete in. Afterwards, the teams meet together for what is known as Rope Run, which is a sort of "pep rally" in preparation for Pull. The Pullers line up in the same order as their respective pits, alternating between paired Even and Odd Years. The Rope Run can often get violent, as it puts opposed teams near one another at a time when emotions are running high. Coaches and alumni have been known to swear and spit as Pullers and Moralers jog around campus with the rope, chanting "Even Year, Odd Year". After Rope Run, each Pull Team gathers separately to do their respective chants and songs.

Pull begins at 3 pm. Each team has 20 pairs of Pullers and Moralers. Moralers were once called "Morale Girls" but this was changed to allow more gender neutrality. There have been several female pullers. The first male Moraler was in 2021. Moralers are important supporters for Pullers because of the physical and mental strain of the competition. Their key purpose, however, is to communicate the calls sets to the Pullers so that the entire team can move in sync. Even Year and Odd Year each have their own secretive methods for deciding how Pullers may choose their Moralers. At the beginning of the event, the rope is marked at the front of Pit 1 so that the winner and the margin of victory can be measured. While there are 20 pairs of Pullers and Moralers, there are only 18 pits. Each team has what are called "sprinters" and "marathoners". Each year has a strategy as to which pits they reserve for these special members of the teams. The sprinters participate during the first half hour of Pull, as it is both very crucial and very tiring. At the half hour mark, the sprinters exit their pits and the marathoners take their place. There are doctors and judges on each side, and if it is deemed that someone must come off the rope, a sprinter or marathoner may fill in. The last Puller is the "Anchor", and is typically the heaviest member of the team. The Anchor and their Moraler are the only members of the team who are standing for the entirety of Pull. "Pit 17" is in front of the anchor, so they will occasionally take on the Anchor's duties while they adjust the rope.

When a team has lost so much rope that they must move their Anchor into the pit in front of them to compensate, they then have 30 minutes to regain that pit. If they do not do so, The Pull is called, and the opposing team wins. During this last half hour, each team removes the large banner that blocks the view of the other team. Originally, the losing team was the team pulled into the river, though the event is now held over land.

== Even Year versus Odd Year ==
Since The Pull always places even graduation years in opposition to odd graduating years, a rivalry has ensued between the two sets of years. Odd Year's colors are maroon and gold, while Even Year's are red, white, and black.
