= John Pattnot =

American swim coach (1972)

Dr. John Pattnot
- Pattnot as YMCA swimmer in 1965

Biographical details
- Born: June 17, 1946 (age 80); California, U.S.
- Education: Fresno State BA 1969; Fresno State MA 1972; University of Utah PHd. 1984

Playing career
- 1965–1969: Fresno State
- Positions: freestyle, butterfly, medley

Coaching career (HC unless noted)
- 1972–1977: Fresno State
- 1977–1978: Bullard High School
- 1978–2019: Hope College

Head coaching record
- Overall: 178-88-1 (66.9 Winning %) (Hope College Men); 259-45 (78.8 Winning %) (Hope College Women)

Accomplishments and honors

Championships
- 32 MIAA Conference Championships (Hope Men and Women); NCAA Div. III Championship Team Runner-up (Hope Women 1994, Hope Men, 1995)

Awards
- 3xNCAA Division III National Coach of the Year '91, '94, '98; CSCAA 100 Greatest Coaches '21; CSCAA NCAA Div. III Hall of Fame '24

Dr. John Patnott (born June 17, 1946) was an American competitive swimmer for Fresno State College and a professor of exercise physiology and was head swim coach for Holland, Michigan's Hope College from 1978 to 2019. During his coaching tenure, Pattnot mentored 30 national champions, and 118 All-Americans. Dominant in regional competition, while leading Hope College in the Michigan Intercollegiate Athletic Association (MIAA) Conference, he had twenty women's conference team championships and twelve men's conference team championships. On the national level, his Hope men's swimmers were NCAA Division III runners-up to the exceptionally dominant Kenyon swim team in 1995, and his Hope women's swim team were NCAA Division III runners up to Kenyon in 1994.

== Early life ==
A California native, Patnott was born June 17, 1946, and swam for the Richmond YMCA Sharks where he was led by Head Coach Bob O'Brien, a former U.S. Olympic diver, and Assistant Coach Pat Larue. In 1963, the Richmond YMCA swim team was coached by Perry Dolan. In August 1964, in the 17 and under age group, Patnott swam a first place 2:01.0 in the 100 individual medley leading his Richmond YMCA team to a victory in a dual meet with the El Cerrio Swim Center team. In March 1965, he placed first in the 160-yard medley with a 1:56.5, and the 100-yard butterfly with a 1:03.6. On June 26, 1965, he was a triple winner for the Richmond Y at the Memorial Youth Center Meet, placing first in the 400-yard freestyle with a 4:40.8, the 100-yard butterfly with a 1:02.8, and the 160-yard Individual Medley with a 1:57.4.

== Fresno State College ==
Patnott attended and swam for the Fresno State College Bulldogs from around 1966–1969. At Fresno State, Pattnot was coached by Ara Hairabedian, a former High School gymnastics champion from Los Angeles's Roosevelt High and All-city football player who attended the University of Southern California. Hairabedian, who served as a Head Swim and Diving Coach at Fresno from 1953 to 1978, focused primarily on diving at Fresno State when Pattnot first headed the swim team, and later established the college's water polo team around 1960.

On February 24, 1968, Pattnot swam a first place 2:18.4 in the 200-yard butterfly for Fresno State against the University of the Pacific. Pattnot's mastery of multiple strokes would later be one of his strengths as a future collegiate coach. In February 1969, he placed second in the 200 butterfly, and third in the 500 freestyle in a meet against San Jose State. With Pattnot placing sixth overall in the 200-yard butterfly with a 2:13.5 on March 7, 1969, the Fresno State Swim team placed second in the California Collegiate Athletic Association Meet to the powerful Long Beach State team.

== Swim coaching ==
Patnott began his coaching career as head swimming coach of Fresno State College from 1972 to 1977, his alma mater, though he may have begun as early as 1969 as an Assistant Student Coach, where he was mentored under Head Coach Ara Hairibedian, a USC graduate and gymnastics champion who would later earn a Doctorate in Education from Stanford. Pattnot also had some responsibilities coaching the Water Polo team during this period as well. When Pattnot had to leave as Coach of the Fresno State swimming program in 1977, partly due to budget cuts, he was replaced by former Fresno swimmer and water polo player Rick Rozario who began as coach in 1977–78. Pattnot briefly coached water polo and swimming for Fresno's Bullard High School for the 1977–78 school year where he also taught classes and coached at the Fresno Swim Club Pattnot completed his B.A. from University of California, Fresno in 1969 in health and physical education.

== Hope College ==
He started the swimming program at Michigan's Hope College in the Fall of 1978 where he continued through July 2019, building a forty-year legacy at the school. Patnott's initial academic role at Hope was teaching Health Dynamics and activity classes, but he would also teach Exercise physiology, Athletic performance, nutrition, Health and Exercise Science, and Fitness Assessment. In line with his swim coaching duties, he also taught the science of strength conditioning. Much of his research focus in the field of exercise physiology addressed the production of lactate in competitive swimmers and how training could facilitate the production of lactate. While at Hope, he also headed the University's Review Board for the research performed by both students and faculty at Hope.

=== Hope College coaching highlights ===
Making a noteworthy impact in the first two decades as Hope's first swim coach, Pattnot's women's team placed third in the MIAA conference in his first year in 1978, and subsequently placed either first or second in the conference through 1999, with his men's and women's team winning a combined 17 conference championships. A frequent contender for national honors, in his first decade as coach between 1988-1998, Pattnot's Hope women's team placed in the top five times in the NCAA Division III national championships.

By the end of his tenure as Coach at Hope in 2018, his men's and women's teams won a combined total of 32 Michigan Intercollegiate Athletic Association Conference Championships with the vast majority occurring between 1979 and 2004. The MIAA currently consists of nine Division III schools in the Michigan and Indiana areas. Patnott led the Hope Flying Dutch Women's team to a total of 20 MIAA women's team championships. He led the Hope Men's Flying Dutchmen swim team to 12 MIAA team championships. He had a dual meet record of 259-45 for a 78.7 winning percentage with the Women's Flying Dutch swim team. With a slightly lower winning percentage, Pattnot's Hope College Men's team had a dual meet record of 178-88-1 for a winning percentage of 66.9. In a total of 31 events, he produced National Championship titlists at Hope.

In NCAA Division III Swimming and Diving national competition in 1999 in Oxford, Ohio, the Hope Men's swim team under Pattnot were runners-up, finishing second place to the exceptionally dominant Kenyon College under Jim Steen. The Hope women's swim and diving team were runners-up to Kenyon at the NCAA Division III team championship in 1994. A not infrequent contender for National honors, his men's and women's teams at Hope had four top four finishes at the Division III NCAA championships.

Patnott trained thirty national champions, and over a hundred All-Americans. His swimmers included forty All-Americans in Academics as well. Hope swimmers under Pattnot's direction won MIAA Most Valuable Swimmer honors for the MIAA conference 12 times among the men's swimmers and 20 times among his women's swimmers. Pattnot was replaced by Hope swimmer Jake Taber who had been coached as a swimmer by Pattnot at Hope and formerly served as Pattnot's Assistant Coach from 2004-2007. One of his Patnott's top men's swimmers was Josh Boss of the Hope College Class of 2002, who was also a CSCAA Division III Hall of Fame recipient. Boss captured national titles in the 200 breast all four years at Hope from 1999-2002, and was a three-time champion on the national level in the 100 breast.

Around 1984, Patnott completed a PhD. in exercise physiology from the University of Utah.

=== Honors ===
In 2003, he was a recipient of the Provost's Award given by Hope College for Excellence in Teaching. He has been named an NCAA Division III National Coach of the Year by the College Swimming Coaches Association (CSCAA) three times, for the men in 1991, and the women for 1994 and 1998.

Pattnott received CSCAA's lifetime achievement award in 2018. In 2021, he was selected as one of CSCAA's 100 Greatest Coaches of the last 100 years during CSCAA's 100th birthday celebration. In May 2024, he was formally admitted to CSCAA's inaugural NCAA Division III Hall of Fame.
