= Elwood Robinson =

American academic

Elwood L. Robinson
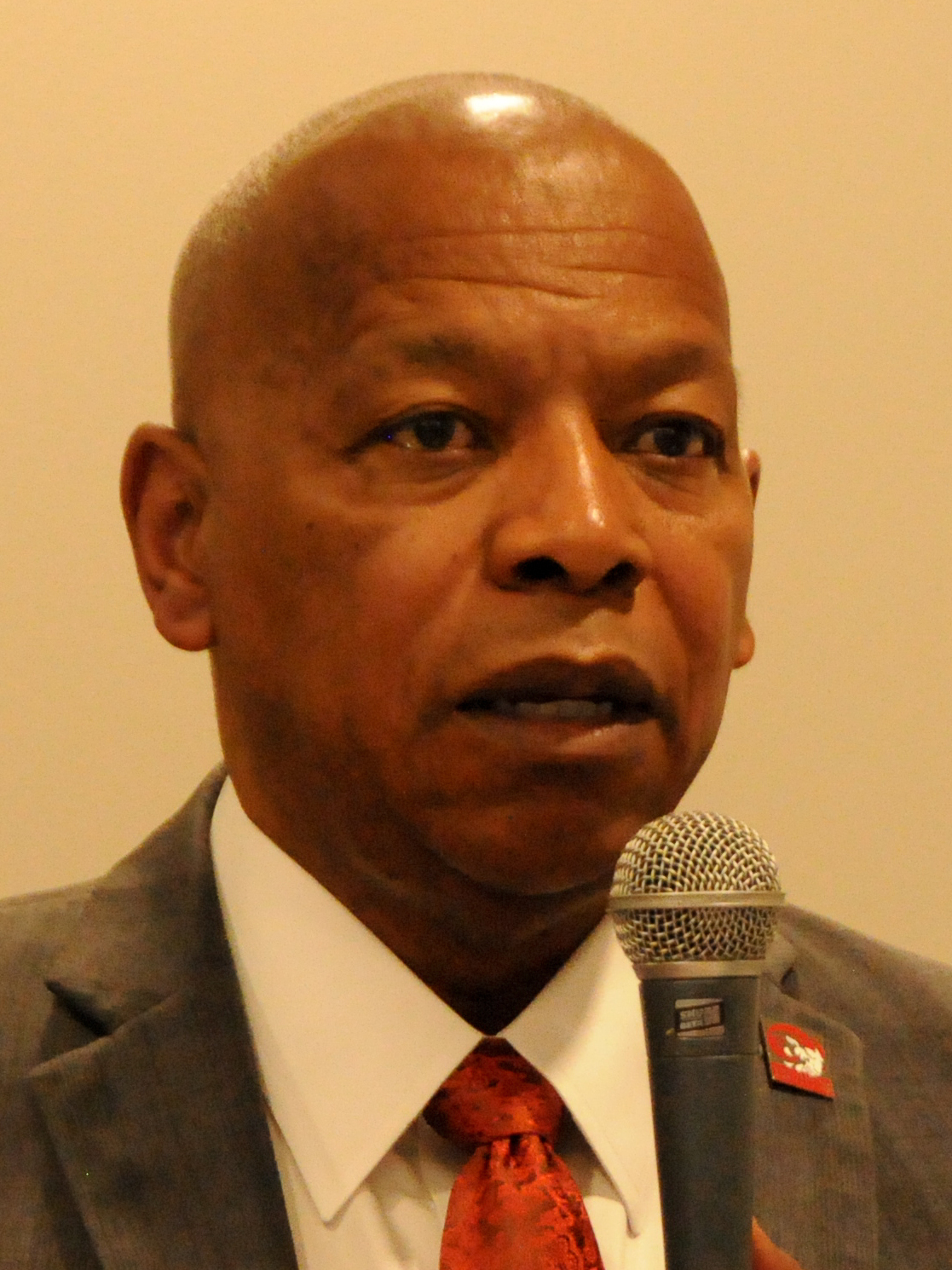
- Robinson in 2022

Chancellor of Winston-Salem State University
- In office 2015–2023
- Preceded by: Donald Reaves
- Succeeded by: Bonita Brown

Provost and Vice President of Academic Affairs at Cambridge College
- In office 2012–2014

Personal details
- Born: Elwood Lee Robinson; November 28, 1955 (age 70) Ivanhoe, North Carolina
- Spouse: Myra Denise Robinson
- Education: North Carolina Central University
- Profession: Academic Administrator
- Website: Chancellor Elwood L. Robinson

Elwood L. Robinson is an American academic, university administrator and clinical psychologist. In June 2023, he retired as thirteenth Chancellor of Winston-Salem State University. He previously served as Provost and Vice President of Academic Affairs at Cambridge College in Cambridge, Massachusetts.

== Early life and education ==
Robinson was born in Sampson County, North Carolina. It was not until Robinson was a senior in high school that the family got a telephone. Robinson attended Union High School in Clinton, North Carolina.

Robinson graduated magna cum laude with a degree in psychology from North Carolina Central University in 1978; he received a master's degree in psychology from Fisk University in 1980; and he received a doctorate in clinical psychology from Pennsylvania State University in 1986. Between 1990 and 1993, Robinson completed his clinical training as a research associate at Duke University Medical Center.

== Career ==
Robinson spent more than 20 years as a professor and administrator at North Carolina Central University in Durham, North Carolina, joining the faculty there in 1984. He served as Chair of the Psychology Department and became the founding Dean of the College of Behavioral and Social Sciences in 2006. During that time at NCCU, Robinson also served as Director of Minority Access and Research Career, which provides research-training opportunities for students and faculty from minority groups underrepresented in the biomedical services, and as director of NCCU's Alcohol Research Center, which was funded by a grant from the National Institute of Alcohol Abuse and Alcoholism. He left NCCU in 2012 to become Provost and Vice President of Academic Affairs at Cambridge College in Cambridge, Massachusetts, a position he held until becoming Chancellor at Winston-Salem State University in January 2015.

Robinson is an active scholar with hundreds of scientific publications and presentations. His short story, "Wednesdays and Sundays," is part of Keeping the Faith, Stories of Love, Courage, Healing and Hope from Black America, edited by Tavis Smiley. This book won the 2003 NAACP Image Award, "Most outstanding Literary Work, Nonfiction.” His latest work, “The Power of Unconditional Love,” was published in Inspiring Student Writers: Strategies and Examples for Teachers.

He has presented his research on the psychosocial and behavioral aspects of disease and illness in African Americans at seminars and workshops throughout China, Egypt, South Africa and the United States.
