= Bonita Brown =

American lawyer and academic administrator

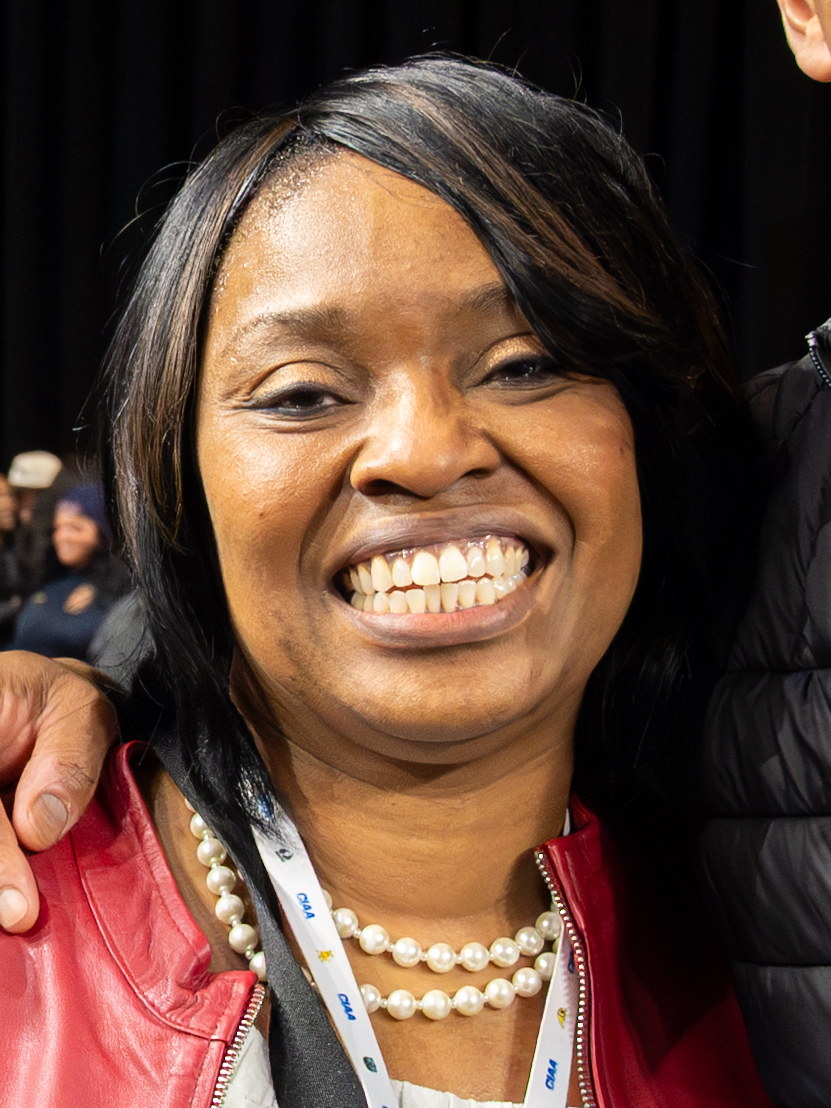
- Brown in 2026

Chancellor of Winston-Salem State University
- Incumbent
- Assumed office June 2024
- Preceded by: Elwood L. Robinson

Interim President of Northern Kentucky University
- In office January 2023 – October 2023
- Preceded by: Ashish Vaidya
- Succeeded by: Cady Short-Thompson

Personal details
- Children: 2
- Education: Wake Forest University (BA, JD)

Bonita J. Brown is an American lawyer and academic administrator who is currently the fourteenth Chancellor of Winston-Salem State University, as of July 1, 2024. Her formal investiture ceremony was held September 19, 2025.

== Life ==
Brown was raised in Welcome, North Carolina. She earned a B.A. from Wake Forest University in 1995 and J.D. from Wake Forest University School of Law in 1997.

Brown worked as a staff attorney in Washington, D.C. in corporate legal work after graduating from law school.

In 2001, she returned to North Carolina and joined the staff at Livingstone College as an assistant to its leadership team. She was as the chief of staff at the University of North Texas. Brown then was the vice chancellor and chief of staff at the University of North Carolina at Greensboro before moving to Winston-Salem State University where she served as an assistant attorney for the university. She was later general counsel of the University of North Carolina School of the Arts, also located in Winston-Salem.

Brown also worked in non-profit organization, including a position as the director of the higher education practice at Education Trust in Washington, D.C. She later worked for the nonprofit, Achieving the Dream, as its vice president for network engagement.

Brown joined Northern Kentucky University (NKU) in May 2019 as its vice president and chief strategy officer. Following Ashish Vaidya's departure in 2022, she was selected as the interim president of NKU in January 2023. Cady Short-Thompson succeeded Brown in October 2023.

In late May 2024, Brown was announced as the fourteenth Chancellor of Winston-Salem State University. She is the first woman to lead WSSU and succeeded Elwood Robinson, who retired in June 2023.

== Personal life ==
Brown is married to Wesley Brown. They have a son and daughter.
