= Polish Dragon Boat Racing =

Aquatic sport

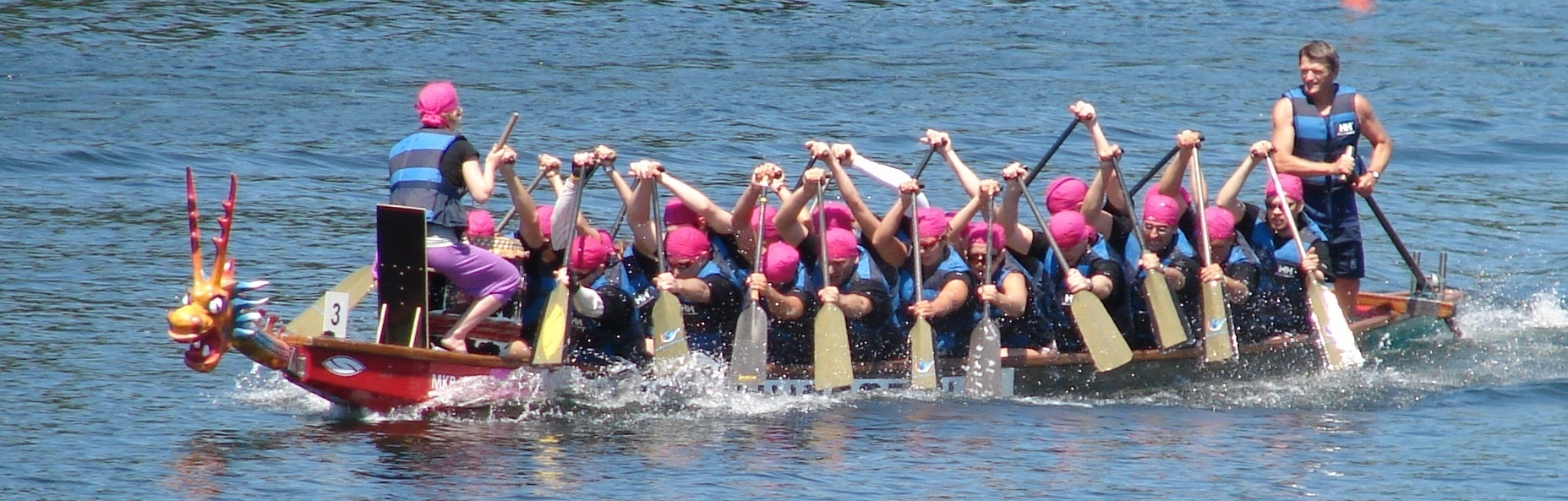
In tug-of-oars, two teams of six (or eight) people sit facing each other in dragon boats like these, and attempt to paddle toward each other.

Polish Dragon Boat Racing, also referred to as "tug of oars" or "dragon war", is a sport consisting of two opposing teams of six rowers attempting to row a dragon boat across a center line, and is similar to tug-of-war. The sport gained popularity in Poland in 2015 after a competition on March 21 of that year at the National Dragon Boat Competition in Olsztyn, and also received some media attention in the United States. A popular video of the March 21st match was uploaded to YouTube on March 25, 2015, by YouTuber SmokiPolnocy, and has been viewed over 85,000 times as of October 2025. There is currently no governing body or league for the sport.

== See also ==
- Dragon boat
- Tug of war
