= Cady Short-Thompson =

American academic administrator

7th President of Northern Kentucky University
- Incumbent
- Assumed office October 2, 2023
- Preceded by: Bonita Brown (interim)

Personal details
- Education: University of Cincinnati

Cady Short-Thompson is an American academic administrator who is the president of Northern Kentucky University. She was previously provost of Hope College and dean of the University of Cincinnati Blue Ash College.

== Life ==
Short-Thompson completed a B.A., M.A., and Ph.D. in communication from the University of Cincinnati.

From 1996 to 2010, Short-Thompson served as a professor of communication, graduate program director, and department chair at the Northern Kentucky University (NKU). She was a professor and provost at Hope College. She served as dean of the University of Cincinnati Blue Ash College. She later served as the chief executive officer and executive director of Breakthrough Cincinnati.

In September 2023, Short-Thompson was announced as the seventh president of NKU. She began on October 2, 2023. She succeeded interim president Bonita Brown.
