= Susan Ipri-Brown =

American mechanical engineer

Susan Ipri-Brown is an American mechanical engineer, the president of the American Society of Mechanical Engineers, and a strategic partnership specialist in the Office of Advanced Manufacturing at the National Institute of Standards and Technology.

== Education and career ==
Ipri-Brown has a bachelor's degree in mechanical and aerospace engineering from Princeton University, and a master's degree in mechanical engineering from the Massachusetts Institute of Technology. She also has a teaching certification from Appalachian State University.

She has worked in public schools in North Carolina, in industry for Delphi Automotive, as an analyst for the Michigan state legislature, and in the US Office of Science and Technology Policy. She became associate director of the Office of STEM Education Partnerships at Northwestern University in Illinois, before moving in 2013 to Hope College in Holland, MI. There, she became an associate professor of engineering, director of the ExploreHope outreach program, and associate dean for educational outreach, before moving to her position at NIST.

She was elected as president of the American Society of Mechanical Engineers (ASME) for the 2024–2025 term.

== Recognition ==
Ipri-Brown was elected as an ASME Fellow in 2022.
