= Matthew A. Scogin =

American academic administrator

Matthew A. Scogin is an American academic administrator, business leader, and government official who became the 14th president of Hope College in Holland, Michigan, in 2019. Previous to assuming this role, he held leadership positions at the U.S. Department of the Treasury and the New York Stock Exchange.

== Education ==
Scogin grew up in Portage, Michigan, and graduated from Hope College in 2002 with a Bachelor of Arts degree in political science and economics. During 2001, while participating in Hope College’s Washington Honors Semester, he held an internship at the White House. He also holds a master's degree in public policy from Harvard Kennedy School at Harvard University. After graduating from Harvard, Scogin became a fellow with the Robert Bosch Foundation in Germany where he studied unemployment and labor market policy.

=== Personal life ===
His wife, Sarah, is also a 2002 graduate of Hope College, where she majored in music and computer science. They have three children at home: Sophie, Lucy and Oliver.

=== Government and finance ===
Scogin returned to the U.S. in 2005 and served as the fiscal policy advisor to Mitt Romney, the former governor of Massachusetts. From 2006 to 2008, he was a senior advisor to the under secretary of domestic finance at the U.S. Department of the Treasury.

In 2008, Scogin became chief of staff and senior advisor to the CEO of Wachovia Bank where he worked until 2009. For five years (2009–2014), he worked at NYSE Euronext, serving as the senior vice president and chief of staff at the 3,000-person company that ran the New York Stock Exchange as well as five exchanges in Europe.

From 2014 to 2019, Scogin was managing director and chief administrative officer at the global finance advisory firm, Perella Weinberg Partners in New York City. There he oversaw operations, strategy, corporate services, human resources and communications for the firm's 11 global offices.

=== Academia ===
Scogin assumed the role of president of Hope College on July 1, 2019, and was inaugurated on September 13, 2019. Since taking office, he has launched a new vision and initiative to fully fund tuition called Hope Forward.

=== Awards ===
Scogin received the U.S. Treasury Department Exceptional Service Award in 2008. In 2013, he was one of 19 leaders of New York City to be named a David Rockefeller Fellow by the Partnership for New York City. Hope College recognized him with a Young Alumni Award in 2014.

=== Public communications ===
Scogin's plan for Hope Forward has been written about in the Chronicle of Higher Education and Forbes. In 2022, Scogin presented his vision for Hope Forward at the annual SxSW EDU conference in Austin, Texas. He has also appeared on the Mitch Albom radio show, the Whole Person Revolution podcast the Believe! with Doug DeVos podcast, and Malcolm Gladwell's Revisionist History podcast. In 2024, Scogin became a regular contributor to Forbes, where he writes a column on education and leadership.

== Advisory roles ==
Matthew Scogin is chair of the Michigan Intercollegiate Athletic Association, and serves on the boards of the Michigan Colleges Alliance and Restore NYC.
