= Tug of war =

Sport in which two teams pull on a rope

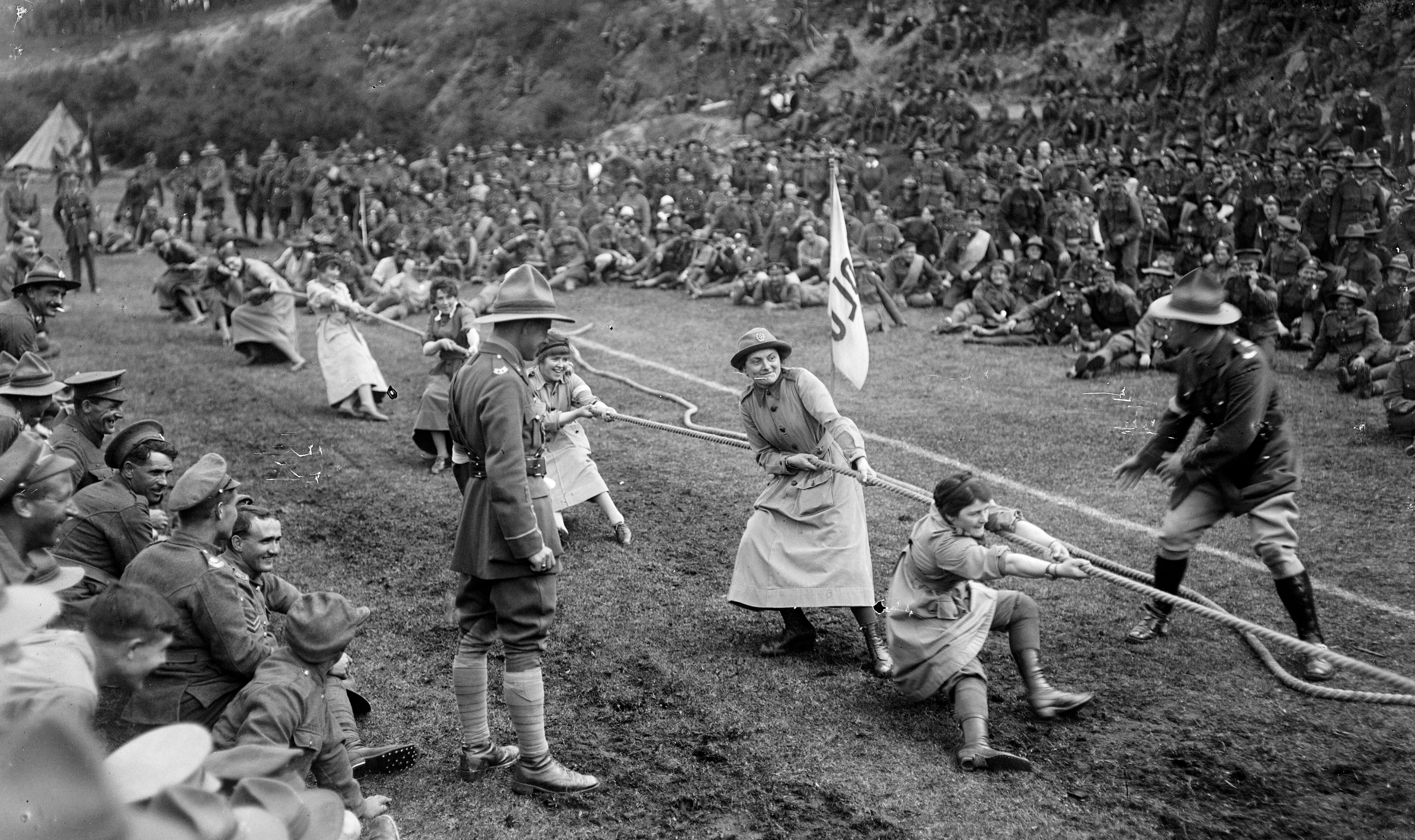
- Members of the Queen Mary's Army Auxiliary Corps competing in France, 3 August 1918
- Highest governing body: Tug of War International Federation
- Nicknames: TOW
- First played: Ancient

Characteristics
- Contact: Non-contact
- Team members: Eight (or more)
- Mixed-sex: mix 4+4 and separate
- Type: Team sport, outdoor/indoor
- Equipment: Rope and boots

Presence
- Olympic: Part of the Summer Olympic programme from 1900 to 1920
- World Games: 1981–present

Tugging rituals and games ល្បែងទាញព្រ័ត្រ (Khmer) Punnuk (Filipino) 줄다리기 (Korean) Kéo Co (Vietnamese)
- UNESCO Intangible Cultural Heritage
- Country: Cambodia, Philippines, South Korea, Vietnam
- Reference: 01080
- Region: Asia and the Pacific

Inscription history
- Inscription: 2015 (10th session)
- List: Representative

Tug of war video from Kerala, India

Tug of war (also known as tug o' war, tug-a-war, tug war, rope war, rope pulling, or tugging war) is a sport in which two teams compete by pulling on opposite ends of a rope, with the goal of bringing the rope a certain distance in one direction against the force of the opposing team's pull. Practiced in ancient Egypt, China, India and Greece, the sport has ancient origins and has been practiced in various cultures throughout history. It was included in the Summer Olympics from 1900 to 1920, but is no longer part of the Olympic program. Tug of war continues to be practiced in schools, community events, and organized competitions worldwide.

Tug of war typically involves teams of eight or more members, though the number can vary. The rope is marked with a centre line and two markers equidistant from the centre. The objective is to pull the opposing team’s marker across the centre line. Specific rules govern techniques, such as prohibiting touching the ground for extended periods of time or lowering one's elbow below the knee during a pull. The sport requires both cooperation of team members and physical strength.

Internationally, tug of war is governed by the Tug of War International Federation (TWIF), which organizes World Championships for nation teams biannually, for both indoor and outdoor contests, and a similar competition for club teams. It is particularly popular in Europe, Asia, and the United States, where it is often featured in festivals and national competitions.

Especially in large-scale competitions, tug of war has caused ropes to break with a sudden release of energy, often resulting in serious injuries, including dismemberments and fatalities, the risk being highest for those standing near the front of either opposing team. This breakage risk can be lessened by use of specially engineered ropes that can withstand the force. Even when the rope remains intact, hazards to participants include second-degree burns and amputations of fingers or hands; these hazards can be minimized by strict observance of safety protocols.

Tug of war features as an important ritual in many societies, holding religious, cultural and historical significance. The sport remains a popular activity in both competitive and informal settings.

== Terminology ==
The Oxford English Dictionary says that the phrase tug of war originally meant "the decisive contest; the real struggle or tussle; a severe contest for supremacy". Only in the 19th century was it used as a term for an athletic contest between two teams who haul at the opposite ends of a rope. Prior to that, French and English was the commonly used name for the game in the English-speaking world.

== Origin ==
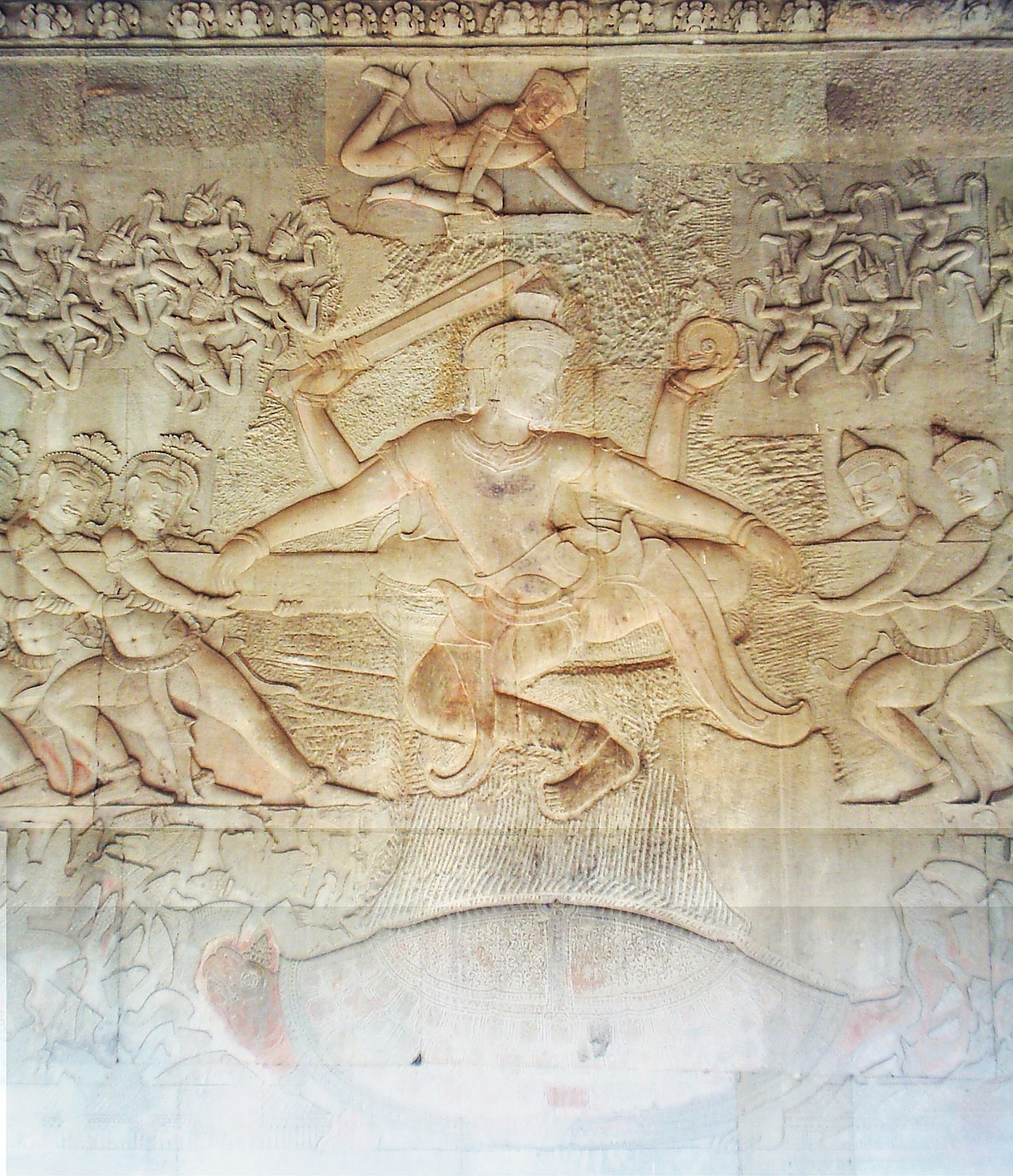
A tug of war between asuras and devas (Angkor Wat, Cambodia)

The origins of tug of war are uncertain, but this sport was practised in Cambodia, ancient Egypt, Greece, India, and China. According to a Tang dynasty book, The Notes of Feng, tug of war, under the name 'hook pulling' (牽鉤), was used by the military commander of the State of Chu during the Spring and Autumn period (8th to 5th centuries BCE) to train warriors. During the Tang dynasty, Emperor Xuanzong of Tang promoted large-scale tug of war games, using ropes of up to 167 metres (548 ft) with shorter ropes attached, and more than 500 people on each end of the rope. Each side also had its own team of drummers to encourage the participants.

In ancient Greece, the sport was called helkystinda (Greek: ἑλκυστίνδα), ephelkystinda (ἐφελκυστίνδα) and dielkystinda (διελκυστίνδα), which derives from dielkō (διέλκω), meaning amongst others 'I pull through', all deriving from the verb helkō (ἕλκω), 'I draw, I pull'. Helkystinda and ephelkystinda seem to have been ordinary versions of tug of war, while dielkystinda had no rope, according to Julius Pollux. It is possible that the teams held hands when pulling, which would have increased difficulty, since handgrips are more difficult to sustain than a grip of a rope. Tug of war games in ancient Greece were among the most popular games used for strength and would help build strength needed for battle in full armor.

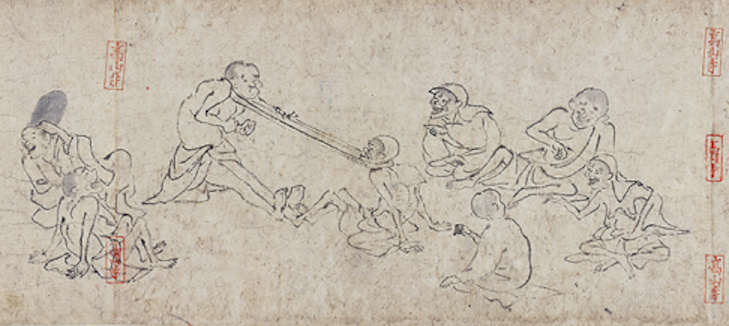
A tug of war in Japan from "Chōjū-jinbutsu-giga" (Animal-person Caricatures) 12–13th century

Archeological evidence shows that tug of war was also popular in India in the 12th century:

There is no specific time and place in history to define the origin of the game of Tug of War. The contest of pulling on the rope originates from ancient ceremonies and rituals. Evidence is found in countries like Egypt, India, Myanmar, New Guinea... The origin of the game in India has strong archaeological roots going back at least to the 12th century CE in the area what is today the State of Orissa on the east coast. The famous Sun Temple of Konark has a stone relief on the west wing of the structure clearly showing the game of Tug of War in progress.

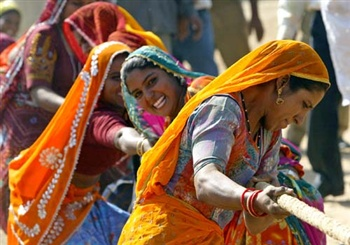
Women in a tug of war, at the annual Pushkar Fair, Rajasthan, India

Tug of war stories about heroic champions from Scandinavia and Germany circulate Western Europe where Viking warriors pull on animal skins over open pits of fire in tests of strength and endurance, in preparation for battle and plunder.

During the 16th and 17th centuries, tug of war was popularised during tournaments in French châteaux gardens and later also in Great Britain.

In the 19th century, tug of war began a new tradition among seafaring men who were required to tug on lines to adjust sails while ships were under way and even in battle.

The Mohave people occasionally used tug-of-war matches as means of settling disputes.

== As a sport ==
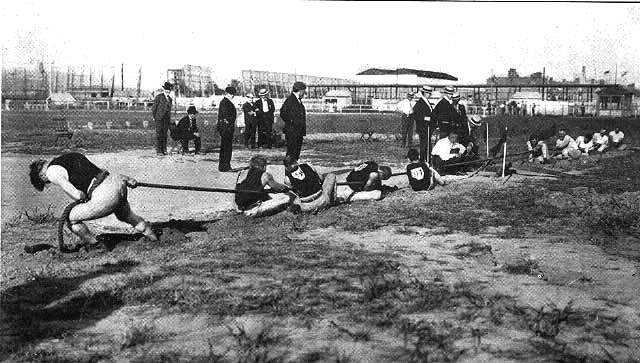
Tug of war competition in 1904 Summer Olympics

There are tug of war clubs in many countries, and both men and women participate.

In June 1879, Birchfield Harriers held their first annual athletics meeting at the Aston Lower Grounds, attended by 4,000 despite the unfavourable weather. Under captain George Ramsay, the six man Aston Villa Football Club lost to West Bromwich Gymnastics Club in the tug of war competition. The sport was part of the Olympic Games from 1900 until 1920, but has not been included since. The sport is part of the World Games. The Tug of War International Federation (TWIF), organises World Championships for nation teams biannually, for both indoor and outdoor contests, and a similar competition for club teams.

In England the sport was formally governed by the AAA until 1984, but is now catered for by the Tug of War Association (formed in 1958), and the Tug of War Federation of Great Britain (formed in 1984). In Scotland, the Scottish Tug of War Association was formed in 1980. The sport also features in Highland Games.

Between 1976 and 1988 Tug of War was a regular event during the television series Battle of the Network Stars. Teams of celebrities representing each major network competed in different sporting events culminating into the final event, the Tug of War. Lou Ferrigno's epic tug of war performance in May 1979 is considered the greatest feat in 'Battle' history.

Starting with the 2024 Pro Bowl Games, the NFL included a five on five Tug of War competition in their Pro Bowl games skills competition.

== National organizations ==
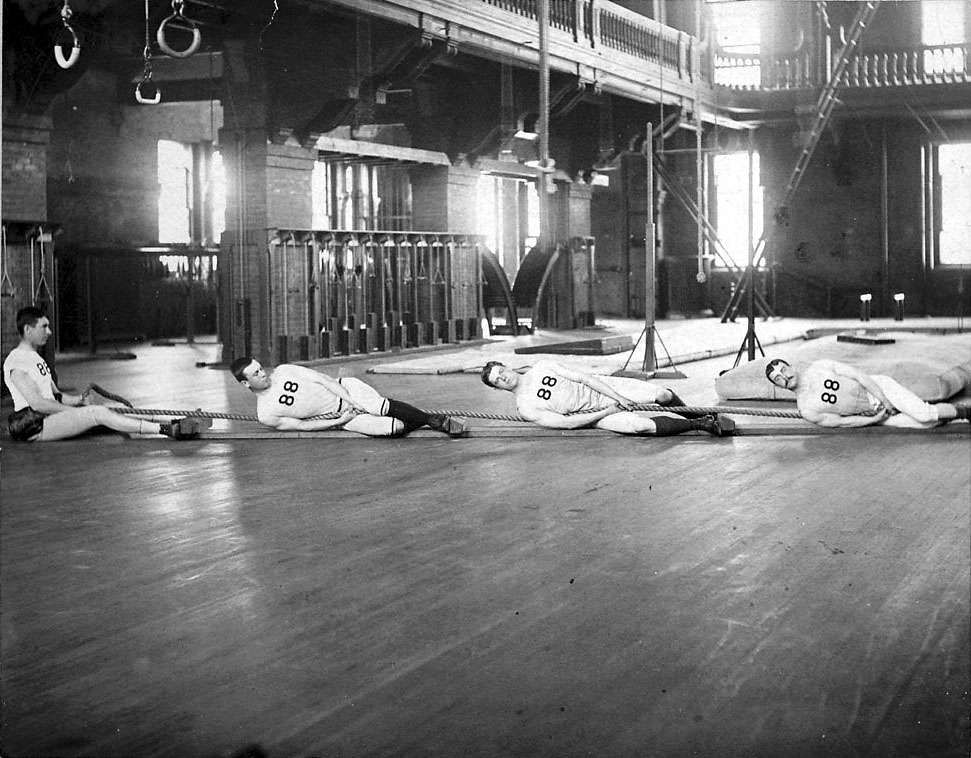
Harvard Tug of War team, 1888

The sport is played almost in every country in the world. However, some countries have set up a national body to govern the sport. Most of these national bodies are associated with the international governing body: TWIF, The Tug of War International Federation. As of 2008 there are 53 countries associated with TWIF, among which are Scotland, Ireland, England, India, Switzerland, Belgium, Italy, South Africa and the United States.

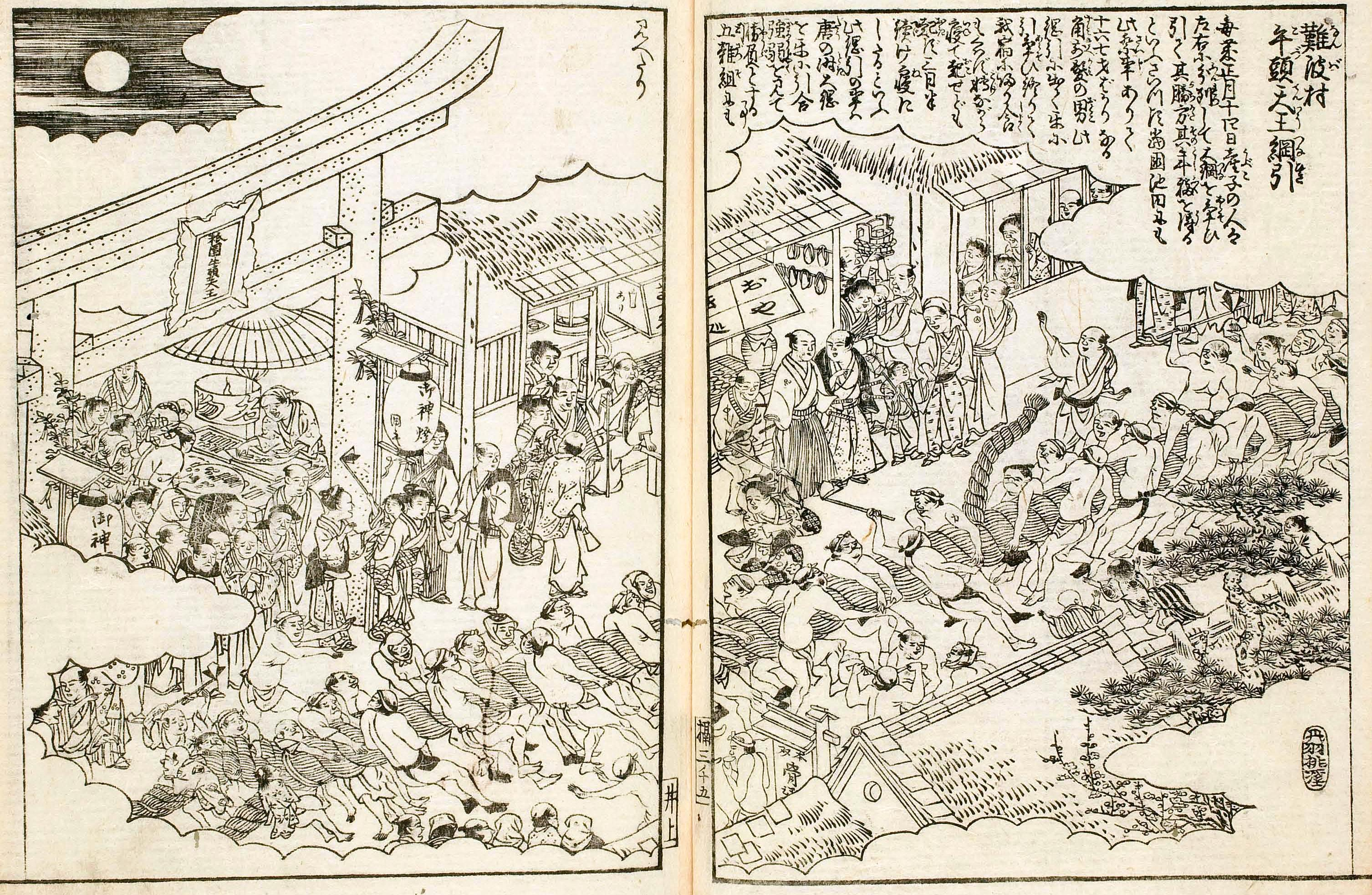
Tug of war as a religious ritual in Japan, drawn in the 18th century. It is still seen in Osaka every January.

== Regional variations ==
=== Burma (Myanmar) ===
In Myanmar (Burma), the tug of war, called lun hswe (လွန်ဆွဲ; pronounced [lʊ̀ɰ̃ sʰwɛ́]) has both cultural and historical origins. It features as an important ritual in phongyibyan, the ceremonial cremation of high-ranking Buddhist monks, whereby the funerary pyres are tugged between opposite sides. The tug of war is also used as a traditional rainmaking custom, called mo khaw (မိုးခေါ်; pronounced [mó kʰɔ̀]), to encourage rain. The tradition originated during the reign of King Shinmahti in the Bagan Era. The Rakhine people also hold tug of war ceremonies called yatha hswe pwe (ရထားဆွဲပွဲ) during the Burmese month of Tabodwe.

=== Indonesia ===
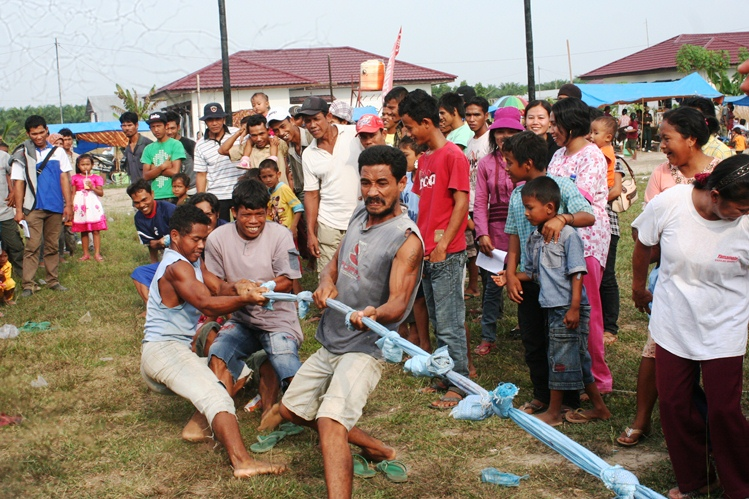
A tug of war game taking place during the celebrations of the Indonesian Independence Day

In Indonesia, Tarik Tambang is a popular sport held in many events, such as the Indonesian Independence Day celebration, school events, and scout events. The rope used is called dadung, made from fibers of lar between two jousters. Two cinder blocks are placed a distance apart and the two jousters stand upon the blocks with a rope stretched between them. The objective for each jouster is to either a) cause their opponent to fall off their block, or b) to take their opponent's end of the rope from them.

=== Japan ===
In Japan, the tug of war (綱引き, tsunahiki) is a staple of school sports festivals. The tug of war is also a traditional way to pray for a plentiful harvest throughout Japan and is a popular ritual around the country. The Kariwano Tug of war in Daisen, Akita, is said to be more than 500 years old, and is also a national folklore cultural asset. The Underwater Tug of War Festival in Mihama, Fukui, is 380 years old, and takes place every January. The Sendai Great Tug of War in Satsumasendai, Kagoshima is known as Kenka-zuna or 'brawl tug'. Around 3,000 men pull a huge rope which is 365 metres (1,198 ft) long. The event is said to have been started by feudal warlord Yoshihiro Shimadzu, with the aim of boosting the morale of his soldiers before the decisive Battle of Sekigahara in 1600. Nanba Hachiman Jinja's tug of war, which started in the Edo period, is Osaka's folklore cultural asset.

=== Ryukyu Islands ===
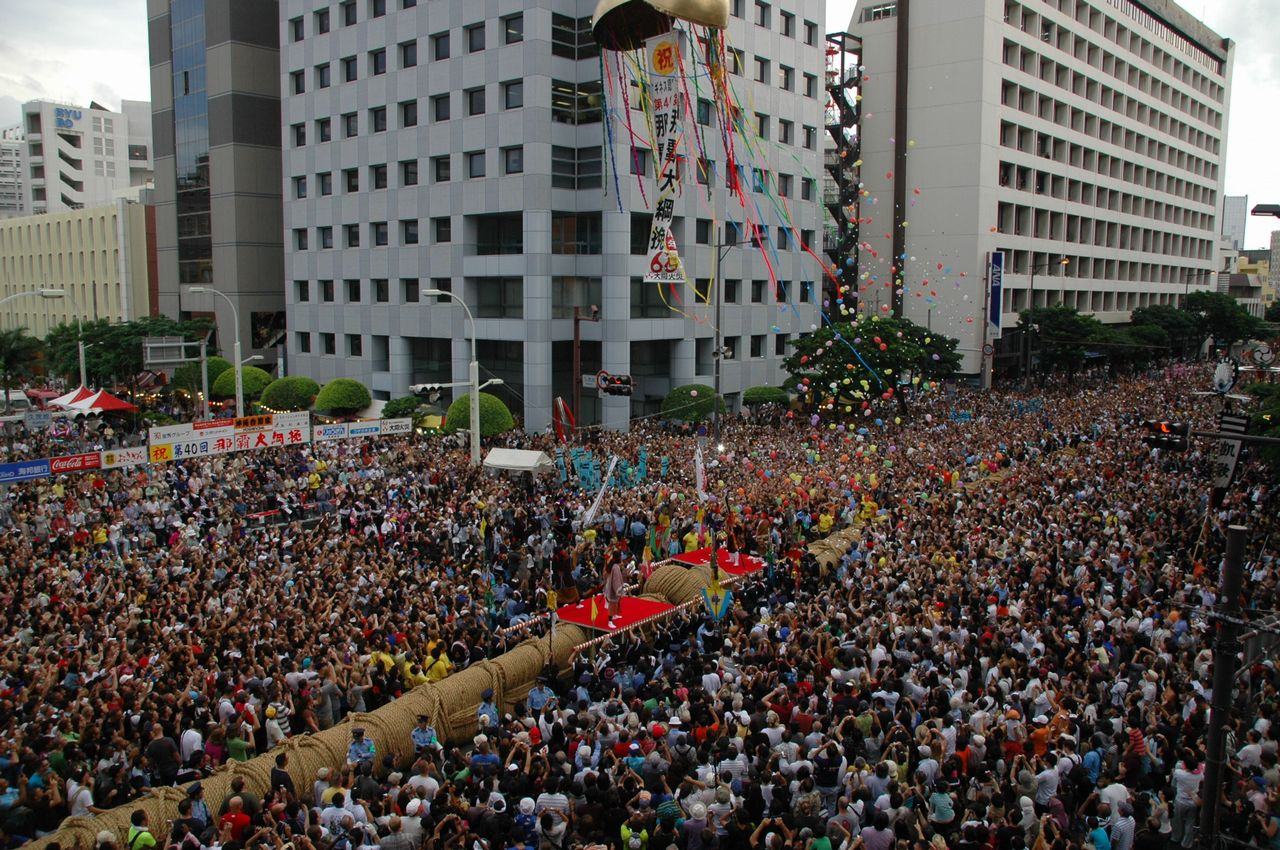
Naha's annual Otsunahiki (giant tug of war) has its roots in a centuries-old local custom. It is the biggest among Ryukyu Islands' traditional tugs of war.

August festivals often feature a communal tug-of-war using a giant fiber rope that can often take days to weave. The Naha Tug-of-war is famous. The rope in Naha is over 200m long and weighs more than 40 metric tons.

=== Korea ===
Juldarigi (Korean: 줄다리기, also chuldarigi) is a traditional Korean sport similar to tug of war. It has a ritual and divinatory significance for many agricultural communities in the country and is performed at festivals and community gatherings. The sport uses two huge rice-straw ropes, connected by a central peg, which is pulled by teams representing the East and West sides of the village (the competition is often rigged in favor of the Western team). A number of religious and traditional rituals are performed before and after the actual competition.

=== New Zealand ===
A variant, originally brought to New Zealand by Boston whalers in the 1790s, is played with five-person teams lying down on cleated boards. The sport is played at two clubs in Te Awamutu and Hastings, supported by the New Zealand Tug of War Association. A four-person variant is played at the National Rover Scout Moot.

=== Peru ===
The Peruvian children's series Nubeluz featured its own version of tug of war (called La Fuerza Glufica), where each team battled 3-on-3 on platforms suspended over a pool of water. The object was simply to pull the other team into the pool.

=== Poland ===
In Poland, a version of tug of war is sometimes played using a dragon boat, where teams of six or eight attempt to row towards each other.

=== Basque Country ===
In the Basque Country, this sport is considered a popular rural sport, with many associations and clubs. In Basque, it is called Sokatira.

=== United States ===
In the United States, a form of tug of war using eight handles is used in competition at camps, schools, churches, and other events. The rope is called an "Oct-O Pull" and provides two-way, four-way and eight-way competition for 8 to 16 participants at one time.

- Each Fourth of July, two California towns separated by an ocean channel Stinson Beach, California and Bolinas, California gather to compete in an annual tug of war.
- The towns of Leclaire, Iowa, and Port Byron, Illinois, compete in a tug of war across the Mississippi River every year in August since 1987 during TugFest.
- A special edition of the Superstars television series, called "The Superteams", features a tug of war, usually as the final event.
- The Battle of the Network Stars featured a tug of war as one of its many events.
- A game of tug of war, on tilted platforms, was used on the US, UK and Australian versions of the Gladiators television series, although the game was played with two sole opposing participants.
- The last known "cleated" tug of war, takes place in Tuolumne CA at the annual Tuolumne Lumber Jubilee. It takes place the weekend after Fathers Day.

==== Miami University ====
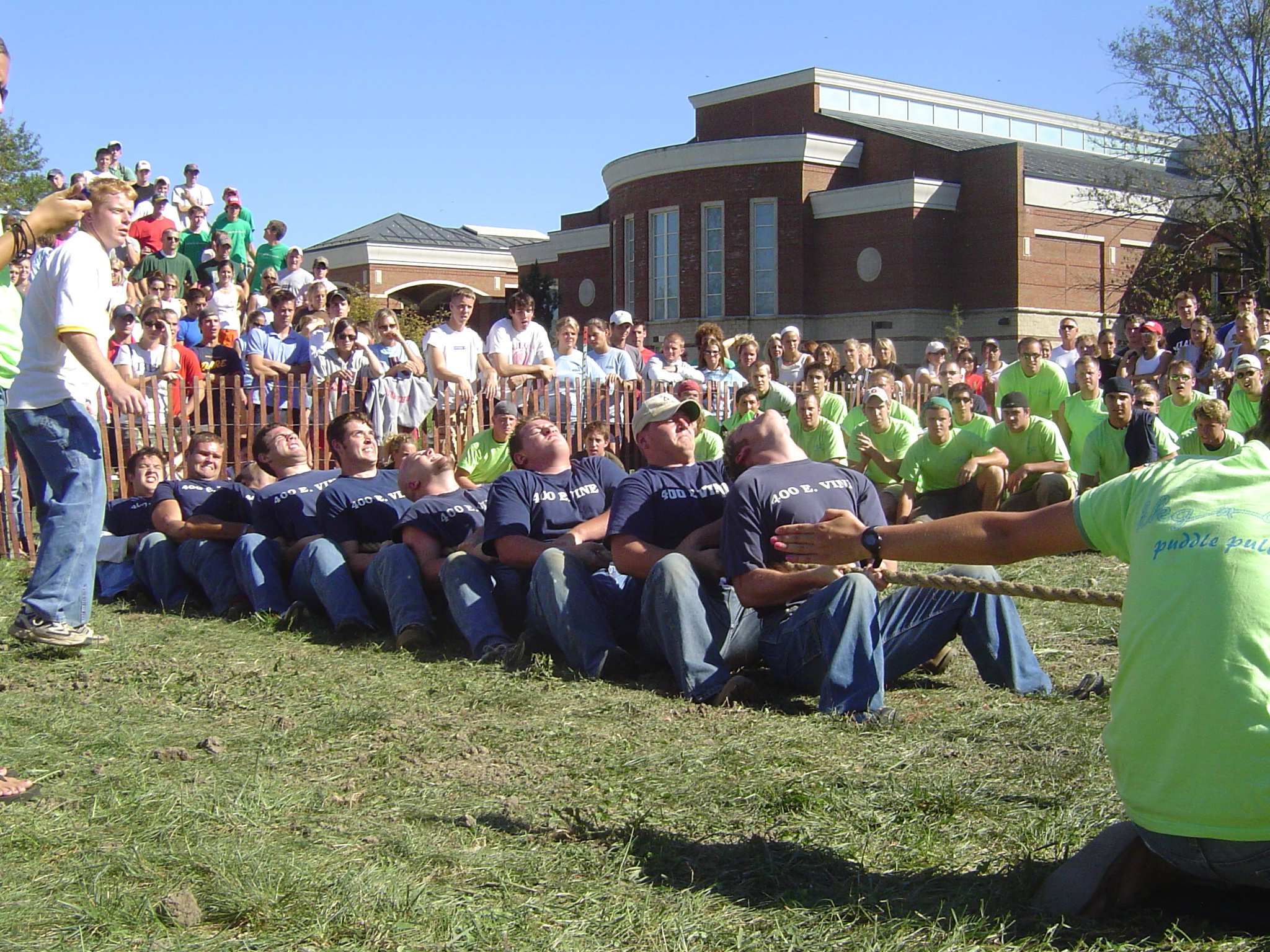
2004 Greek Week Puddle Pull at Miami University

Puddle Pull is a biannual tug of war contest held at Miami University. The event is a timed, seated variation of tug of war in which fraternities and sororities compete. In addition to the seated participants, each team has a caller who coordinates the movements of the team.

Although the university hosted an unrelated freshman vs. sophomores tug of war event in the 1910s and 1920s, the first record of modern Puddle Pull is its appearance as a tug of war event in the school's newspaper, The Miami Student, in May 1949. This fraternity event was created by Frank Dodd of the Miami chapter of Delta Upsilon. Originally, the event was held as a standing tug of war over the Tallawanda stream near the Oxford waterworks bridge in which the losers were pulled into the water. This first event was later seen as a driving force for creating interfraternity competitive activities (Greek Week) at Miami University. As a part of moving to a seated event, a new rule was created in 1966 to prohibit locks and created the event that is seen today with the exception of a large pit that was still being dug in between the two teams. The event is held in a level grass field and uses a 3.8 cm (1.5 in) diameter rope that is at least 15.2 m (50 ft) long is used for the event. Footholes or "pits" are dug for each participant at 50 cm (20 in) intervals. The pits are dug with a flat front and an angled back. Women began to compete sporadically starting in the 1960s and became regular participants as sorority teams in the mid-1980s.

==== Hope College ====
The Hope College Pull is an annual tug-of-war contest held across the Black River in Holland, Michigan on the fourth Saturday after Labor Day. Competitors are 40 members of the freshman and sophomore classes.

== Formal rules ==
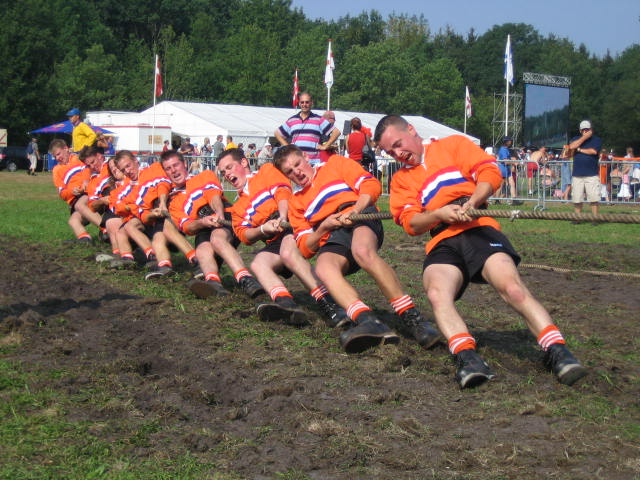
The Dutch team at the 2006 World Championships

Two teams of eight, whose total mass must not exceed a maximum weight as determined for the class, align themselves at the end of a rope approximately 11 centimetres (4.3 in) in circumference. The rope must be free from knots and other "holdings for the hands". The rope is marked with a "centre line" and two markings 4 metres (13 ft) to either side of the centre line. The teams start with the rope's centre line directly above a line marked on the ground, and once the contest (the "pull") has commenced, attempt to pull the other team such that the marking on the rope closest to their opponent crosses the centre line, or the opponents commit a foul.

Lowering one's elbow below the knee during a pull, known as "locking", is a foul, as is touching the ground for extended periods of time. The rope must go under the arms; actions such as pulling the rope over the shoulders may be considered a foul. These rules apply in highly organized competitions such as the World Championships. However, in small or informal entertainment competitions, the rules are often arbitrarily interpreted and followed.

A contest may feature a moat in a neutral zone, usually of mud or softened ground, which eliminates players who cross the zone or fall into it.

== Tactics ==
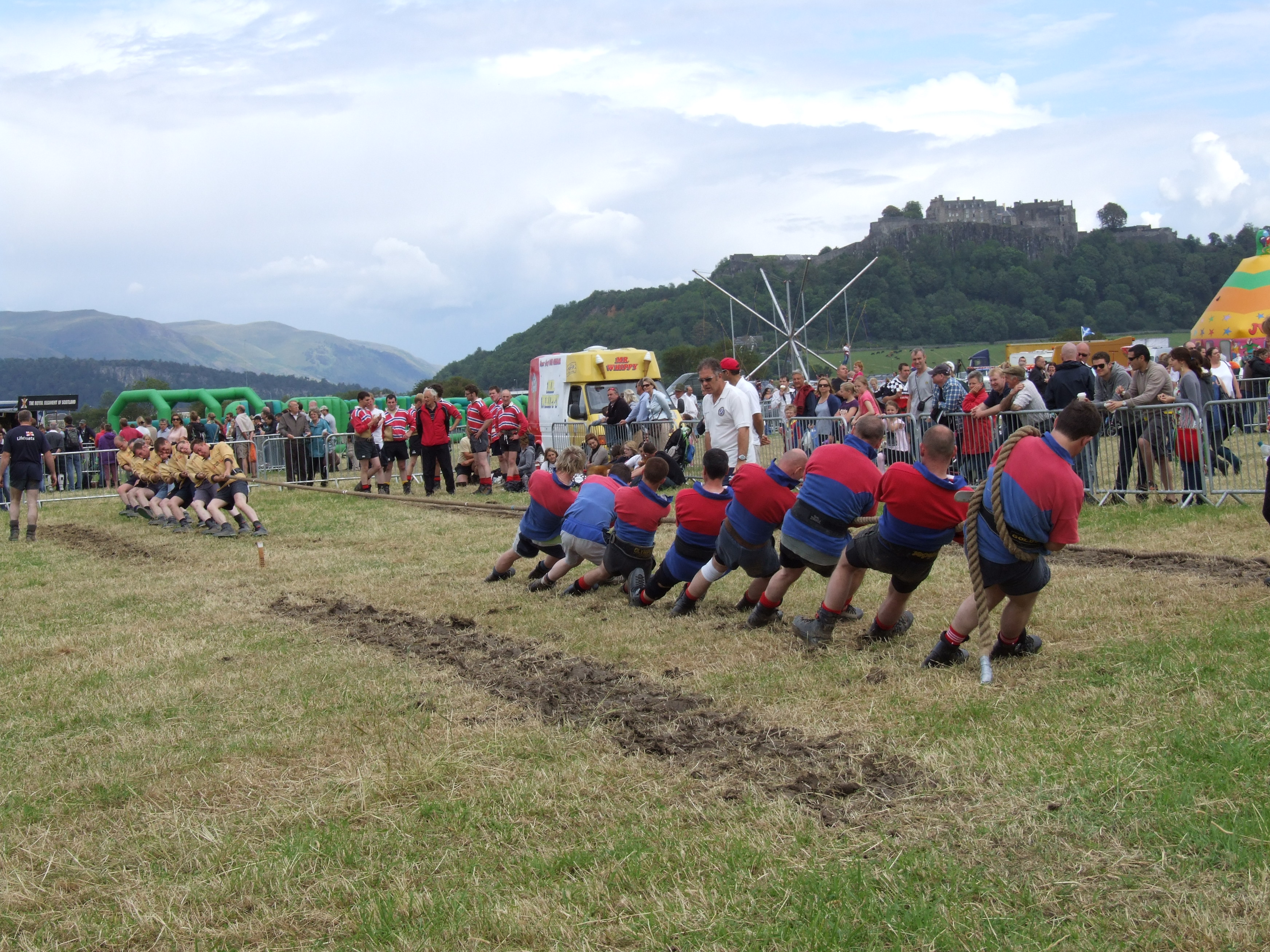
Tug of war at the Highland Games in Stirling, 2011

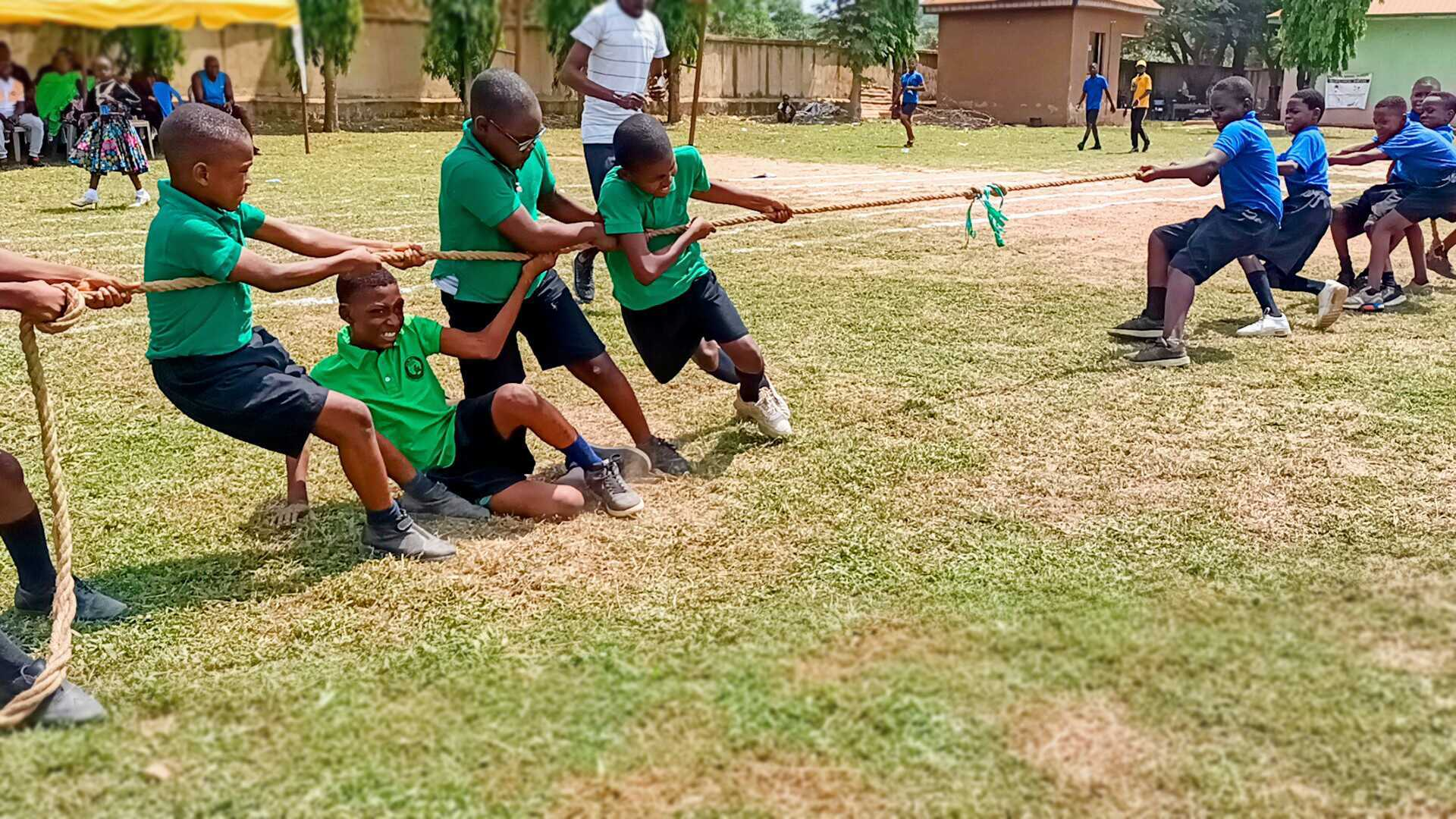
Tug of war between school pupils in Nigeria, 2021

Aside from the raw muscle power needed for tug of war, it is also a technical sport. The cooperation or "rhythm" of team members is just as important as physical strength. To achieve this, a person called a "driver" is used to harmonize the team's joint traction power. The driver moves up and down next to their team pulling on the rope, giving orders to them when to pull and when to rest (called "hanging"). If the driver spots the opposing team trying to pull the driver's team away, the driver gives a "hang" command, each member will dig into the grass with their boots and movement of the rope is limited. When the opponents are played out, the driver shouts "pull" and rhythmically waves their hat or handkerchief for their team to pull together. Slowly but surely, the other team is forced into surrender by a runaway pull.

Another factor that affects the game is the players' weights. The heavier someone is, the more static friction their feet have to the ground, but if there is not enough friction and they weigh too little, even if they are pulling extremely hard, the force will not be transmitted to the rope. Their feet will simply slide along the ground if their opponent(s) have better static friction with the ground. In general, as long as one team has enough static friction and can pull hard enough to overcome the static friction of their opponent(s), that team can easily win the match.

== Injury risks ==
In addition to injuries from falling and from back strains (some of which may be serious), catastrophic injuries may occur as a result of looping or wrapping the rope around a hand or wrist, or impact from snapback if the rope should break. This may cause permanent damage to the body, requiring finger, hand, or even arm amputations.

Amateur organizers of tugs of war may underestimate the forces generated and thus, may be unaware of the possible consequences if a rope snaps under extreme tension. Injury is primarily due to the large amount of potential energy stored in the rope during the competition. As both sides pull, tension is placed on the rope causing it to stretch as described by Hooke's law. If a rope exceeds its breaking point the potential energy is suddenly converted to kinetic energy and the broken ends of the rope will snapback at great speed, which can cause serious injuries. This phenomenon has been studied in ship operations as mooring ropes pose the same risk should they snap. For this reason, specially engineered tug of war ropes exist that can safely withstand the forces generated.

=== Notable incidents ===
Date	Location	Rope snapped	Deaths	Severely Injured	Overall injured	Total participants	Death cause / injury details	Rope details	Other information
13 June 1978	Harrisburg, Pennsylvania, USA	check	0	6	200	~2,300	6 fingers and thumbs amputated	2000 foot (600 m) rope rated for 13,000 lb_{f} (58 kN)	Middle school Guinness Book of Records attempt
4 June 1995	Westernohe, Germany	check	2	5	29	650	Crushed and hit ground hard	"Thumb-thick" nylon	Scouts attempt Guinness Book of Records entry
25 October 1997	Taipei, Taiwan	check	0	2	42	1500	Arms severed below shoulder	5 cm (2 in) nylon, max. strength 26,000 kilograms (57,000 lb)	Official event, with foreign dignitaries
4 February 2013	El Monte, California, USA	check	0	2	2	~40	9 fingers amputated	Unknown	Lunchtime high school activity
14 December 2018	Somaiya Vidyavihar University, Mumbai, India	X mark	1	0	0	Unknown	Cardiac arrest, unknown cause	Unknown	Sports day at Somaiya College of Nursing
18 December 2022	Makassar, Indonesia	check	1	3	13	5,294	Head pulled into concrete barrier by rope	Unknown	World Record Attempt

== In popular culture ==
- The American game show Tug of Words uses a virtual tug of war as its central scoring mechanism.
- In 1982, musician Paul McCartney released an album called Tug of War.

== Bibliography ==
- Henning Eichberg, "Pull and tug: Towards a philosophy of the playing 'You'", in: Bodily Democracy: Towards a Philosophy of Sport for All, London: Routledge 2010, pp. 180–199.
