= Northern Kentucky University =

Public university in Highland Heights, Kentucky, US

- Former name: Northern Kentucky State College (1968–1976)
- Type: Public university
- Established: 1968; 58 years ago
- Academic affiliations: SOCHE; Space-grant
- Endowment: $150.9 million (2025)
- President: Cady Short-Thompson
- Provost: Diana McGill
- Faculty: 1,006
- Administrative staff: 1,021
- Students: 15,370 (fall 2024)
- Undergraduates: 10,327 (fall 2024)
- Postgraduates: 5,043 (fall 2024)
- Location: Highland Heights, Kentucky, U.S. 39°01′55″N 84°27′55″W
- Campus: Suburban, 425 acres (172 ha)
- Colors: Gold and Black
- Nickname: Norse
- Sporting affiliations: NCAA Division I Horizon League
- Mascot: Victor E. Viking
- Website: www.nku.edu

Northern Kentucky University is a public university in Highland Heights, Kentucky, United States. Established in 1968, it is the youngest of Kentucky's eight public universities. The university has seven constituent colleges in arts and science, business, education, informatics, health, and the Salmon P. Chase College of Law.

== History ==
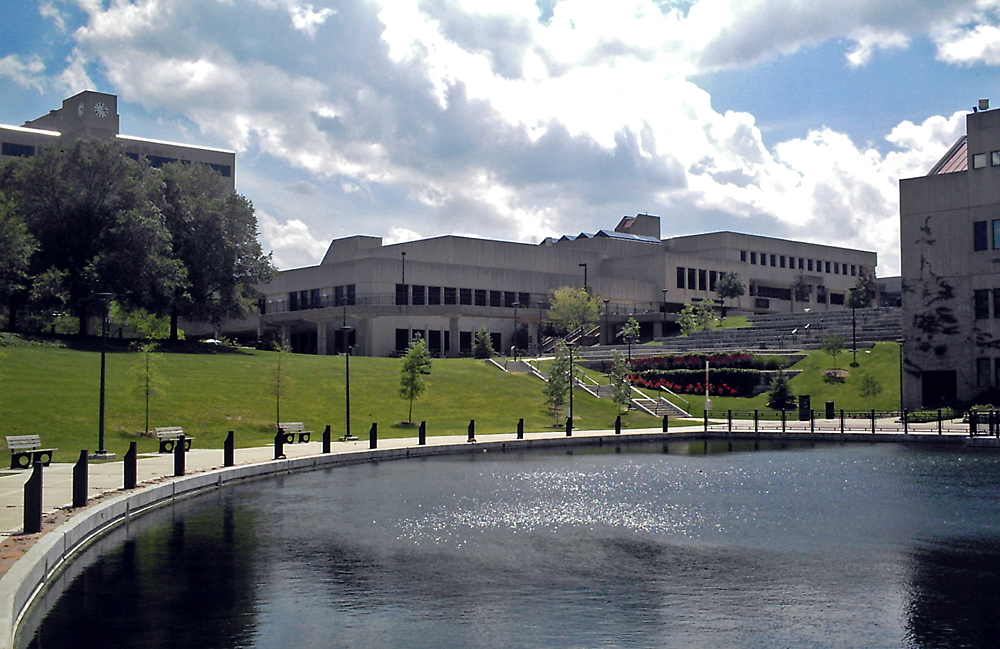
Northern Kentucky University's "Loch Norse" and University Center

Northern Kentucky University began in 1948, when an extension campus for the University of Kentucky was opened in Covington, Kentucky, known as the UK Northern Extension Center. After 20 years in operation as an extension center for UK, it became an autonomous four-year college under the name Northern Kentucky State College (NKSC). In 1970, W. Frank Steely was hired as the first president. The following year, the Salmon P. Chase College of Law, formerly an independent law school in Cincinnati, merged with Northern Kentucky State College. The main campus moved from Covington to Highland Heights, Kentucky, in 1972. NKSC awarded its first bachelor's degrees in 1973. Rapid expansion resulted in the school being upgraded to university status in 1976.

Since its founding in 1968 and elevation to university status in 1976, Northern Kentucky University has expanded with construction projects, new colleges and a larger, more diverse student body. The university has increased its admissions standards.

=== Presidents ===
- W. Frank Steely, 1970–1975
- Ralph Tesseneer, 1975–1976 (interim)
- A. D. Albright, 1976–1983
- Leon Boothe, 1983–1996
- Jack M. Moreland, 1996–1997 (interim)
- James Votruba, 1997–2012
- Geoffrey S. Mearns, 2012–2017
- Gerard St. Amand, 2017–2018 (interim)
- Ashish Vaidya, 2018–2022
- Bonita Brown, 2023 (interim)
- Cady Short-Thompson, 2023–Present

== Campus ==
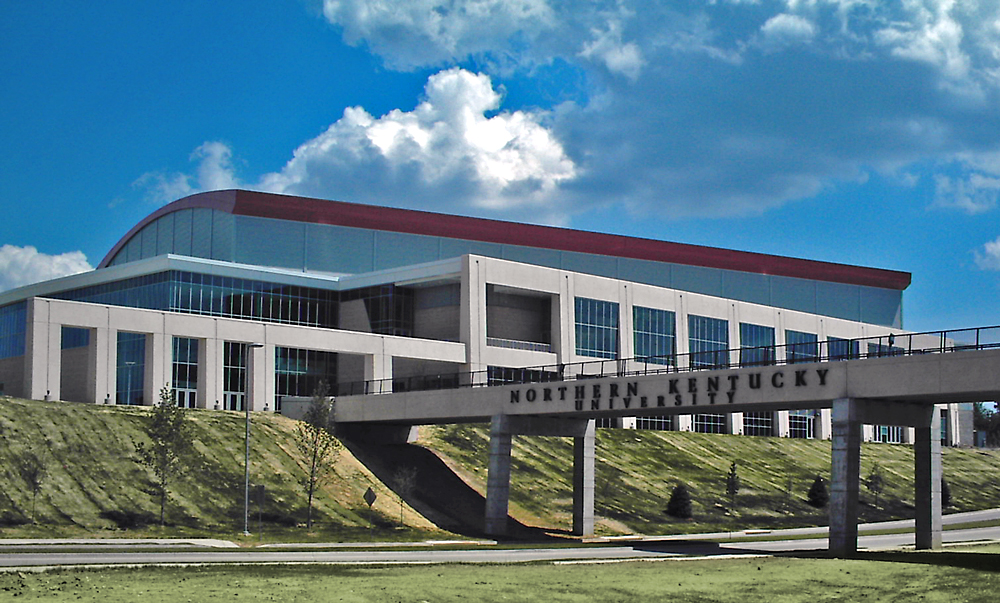
Northern Kentucky's welcome sign, skywalk and arena, Truist Arena

The Northern Kentucky campus plaza in 2010

Northern Kentucky University's main campus in Highland Heights, Kentucky, is situated on 400 acres (1.6 km^{2}) of rolling countryside along U.S. Route 27, just off of Interstate 275 and Interstate 471, seven miles (11 km) southeast of Cincinnati, Ohio. The campus was built beginning in the early 1970s, and the first building, Nunn Hall, opened in 1972. Although most of the university's students commute daily to the campus, approximately 2,000 students live on campus. In recent years, the university has been in the process of expanding its campus and facilities. The Truist Arena is a 9,400-seat arena completed in 2008. It serves as the primary venue for athletics on campus, and also as a venue for entertainment. A Student Union building opened in 2008. The Landrum Academic Center houses an Anthropology Museum. The university campus is also the first educational institute in the world to have a laser-projection planetarium; it is part of the Dorothy Westerman Hermann Natural Science Center.

The campus located in Covington, Kentucky, closed in 2008. It mainly served nontraditional and adult students and also hosted the Program for Adult-Centered Education and Emergency Medical Technology programs. Northern Kentucky University's Grant County Center, located in Williamstown, is a partnership between the Grant County Foundation for Higher Education and Northern Kentucky University.

The Japanese Language School of Greater Cincinnati is a weekend supplementary Japanese school held at the Mathematics, Education and Psychology Center (MP), formerly known as the Business Education Psychology (BEP) Building. It was scheduled to move to NKU in July 1993.

=== Libraries ===
Northern Kentucky's main library is the W. Frank Steely Library, completed in 1975 and named after the first president of the university. The library contains over 850,000 volumes, more than 18,000 bound periodicals, and approximately 1.4 million microforms. The two-floor Chase Law Library is Northern Kentucky's other library on campus, contains more than 313,000 volumes and 57,000 monographic and serial titles.

=== Civic engagement ===
Corporate and university partnerships include The Scripps Howard Center for Civic Engagement the Fifth/Third Entrepreneurial Center the Metropolitan Education and Training Services Center, the Center for Applied Informatics, and Fidelity Investments. Other centers on campus include the Center for Applied Anthropology, the Institute for Freedom Studies, the Center for Environmental Restoration the Small Business Development Center the Institute for New Economy Technologies the Center for Environmental Education the Center for Integrative Natural Science and Mathematics and the Chase Local Government Law Center.

== Academics ==
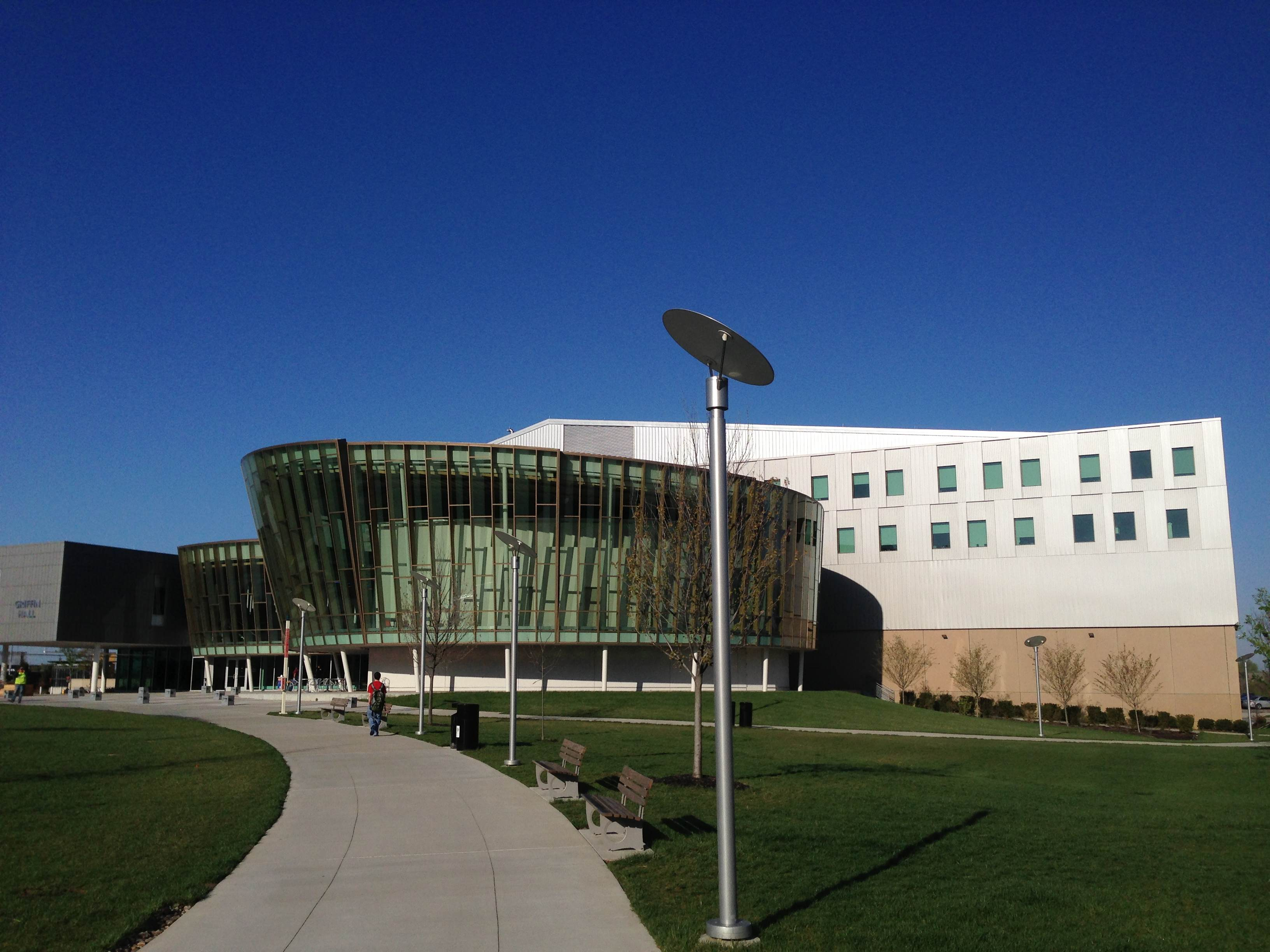
Griffin Hall

Academic rankings

National
- Forbes: 640
- U.S. News & World Report: 382 (tie)
- Washington Monthly: 338

Northern Kentucky University's academic programs are organized into seven colleges. The College of Informatics, founded in 2006, replaced the College of Professional Studies. In July 2015, the School of the Arts was created, uniting the Music, Theatre & Dance, and Visual Arts programs within the College of Arts & Sciences. In 2018, the former Honors Program became the Honors College.

- College of Arts and Sciences
  - School of the Arts
- Haile College of Business
- College of Education
- College of Informatics
  - School of Computing and Analytics
  - School of Media and Communication
- College of Health & Human Services
  - School of Allied Health
  - School of Nursing
  - School of Kinesiology, Counseling, and Rehabilitative Sciences
  - School of Social Work
- Honors College
- Salmon P. Chase College of Law

Northern Kentucky University students are also a part of individual chapters in numerous honor societies. Northern Kentucky's Alpha Beta Phi chapter of Phi Alpha Theta, the International History Honor Society, has won 18 consecutive best chapter awards.

=== Admissions ===
Northern Kentucky University only considers for admission applicants with a 2.0 or above unweighted high school GPA, those with a 2.75 and greater unweighted high school GPA are admitted regardless of ACT or SAT scores, and the university has a 90% acceptance rate. For those submitting test scores, the 2021–2022 final release data by IPEDS reflects scores of admitted students that were 1020-1240 for the SAT and 20-26 for the ACT.

== Student life ==
Undergraduate demographics as of Fall 2023
Race and ethnicity	Total
White	76%
Black	7%
Hispanic	5%
International student	4%
Two or more races	3%
Asian	2%
Unknown	2%
Economic diversity
Low-income (Note: The percentage of students who received an income-based federal Pell grant intended for low-income students.)	30%
Affluent (Note: The percentage of students who are a part of the American middle class at the bare minimum.)	70%

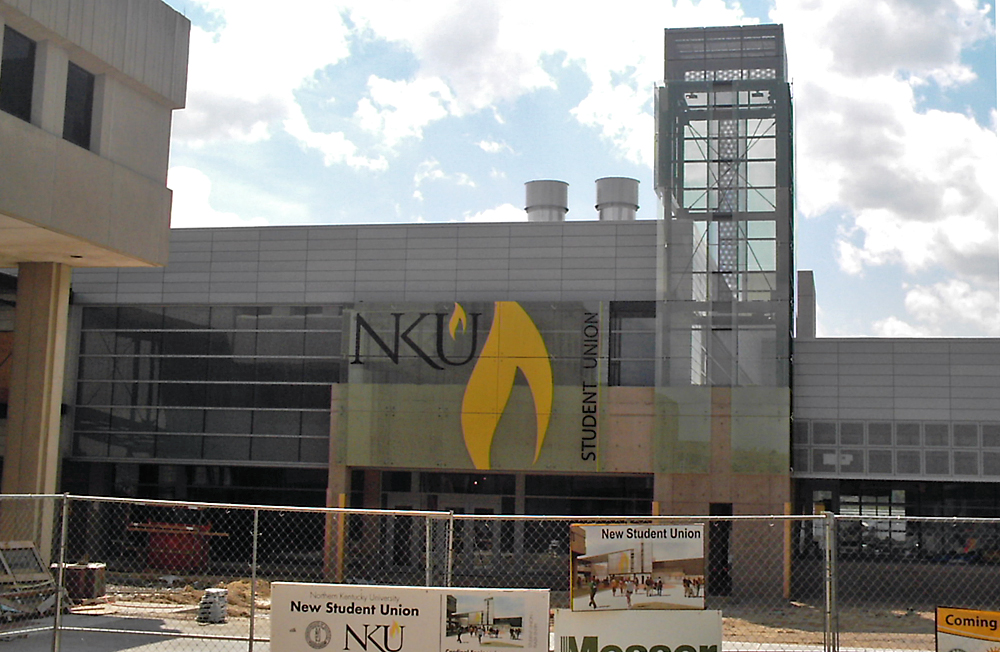
Northern Kentucky University's Student Union building under construction in 2008

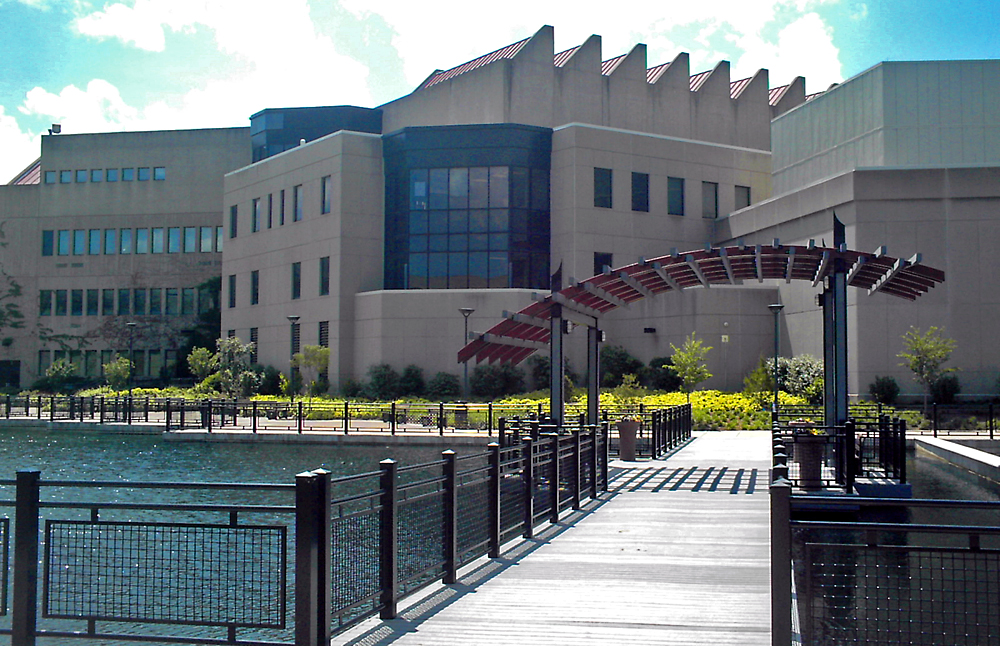
Northern Kentucky University's "Loch Norse" and Fine Arts Center

There are several fraternities and sororities on campus. There is a Student Government Association.

The Northerner is Northern Kentucky's student-run newspaper. The university is also home to an independent, student-run Internet radio station Norse Code Radio. Northern Kentucky University formerly hosted the award-winning public radio station, WNKU, founded in 1986, until the station was sold in 2017.

NorseMediaTV is the PEG access Public-access television cable TV station run by Northern Kentucky University. It airs on channel 818 on Cincinnati Bell Fioptics cable and 18 digital/96 analog on Insight Cable of Northern Kentucky. NorseMediaTV students and faculty produce many original programs, a weekly talk show, various sporting events, and entertainment programming. Many NorseMedia programs have won awards at the local (Blue Chips), regional (Philos) and national (Telly) levels, usually in the professional categories. Students in the program at NKU are invited to create and assist in producing the Electronic Media & Broadcasting programs for the station.

== Athletics ==
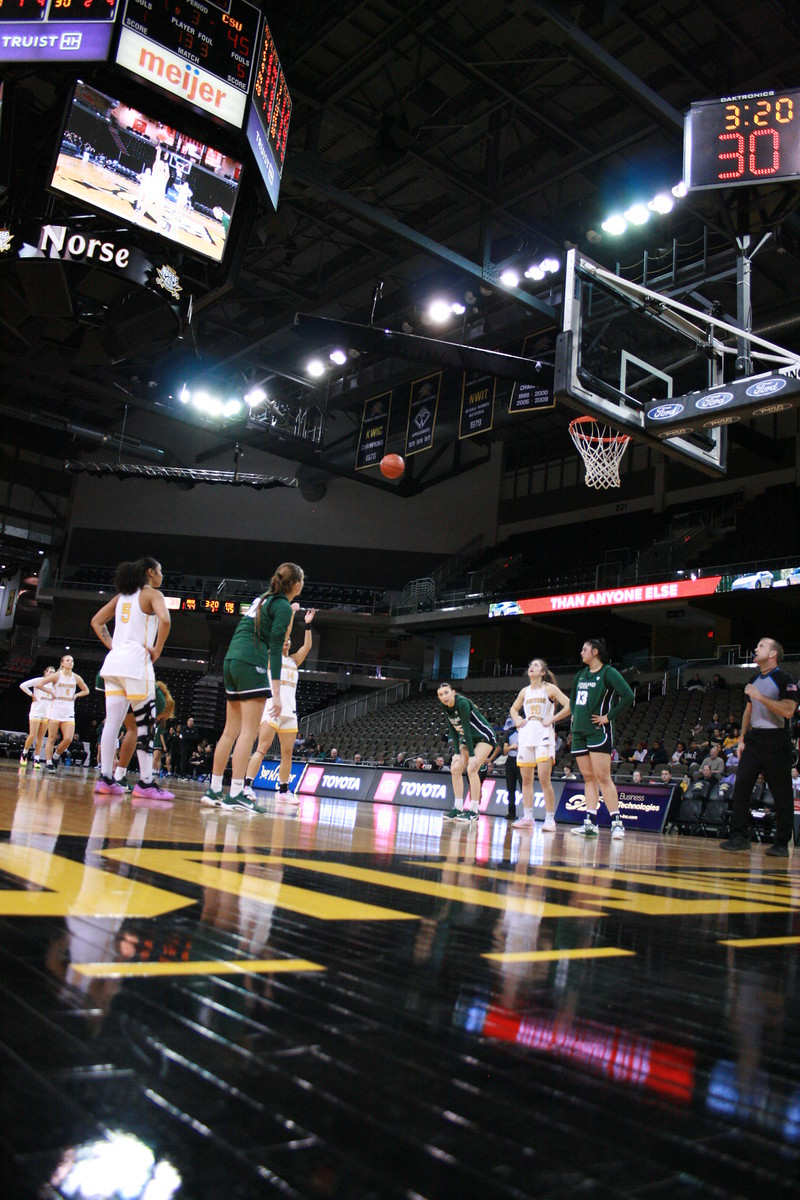
Northern Kentucky University's women's basketball team in 2026

The university's teams for both men and women are nicknamed "Norse". Their mascot is named Victor E. Viking. Northern Kentucky University joined the Horizon League on July 1, 2015, after leaving the Atlantic Sun Conference. The 2016–17 school year was the first in which NKU is eligible for NCAA Division I championships, following the completion of its four-year reclassification period to D-I. The university fields teams in baseball, men's and women's basketball, men's and women's cross country, men's and women's golf, men's and women's soccer, softball, women's track and field, men's and women's tennis and women's volleyball.

Students have also organized club teams in bowling, ice hockey, men's soccer club, fencing, boxing, lacrosse, rugby, kickball, skeet & trap, and men's wrestling. These clubs are primarily organized through the Sport Club program.

== Notable people ==
Northern Kentucky University has over 60,000 living alumni, approximately 41,000 of them in Ohio and Kentucky. Many have gone on to achieve success in a variety of fields, including athletics, journalism, business, and government.

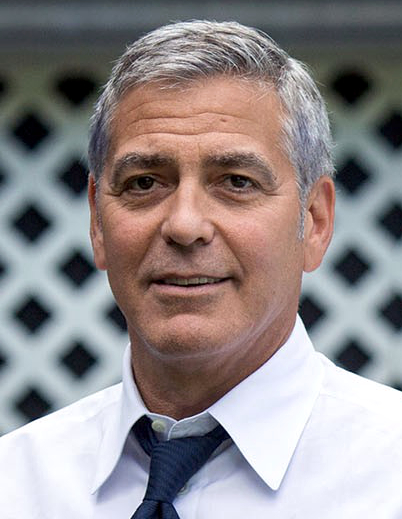
Attended but did not graduate – actor George Clooney

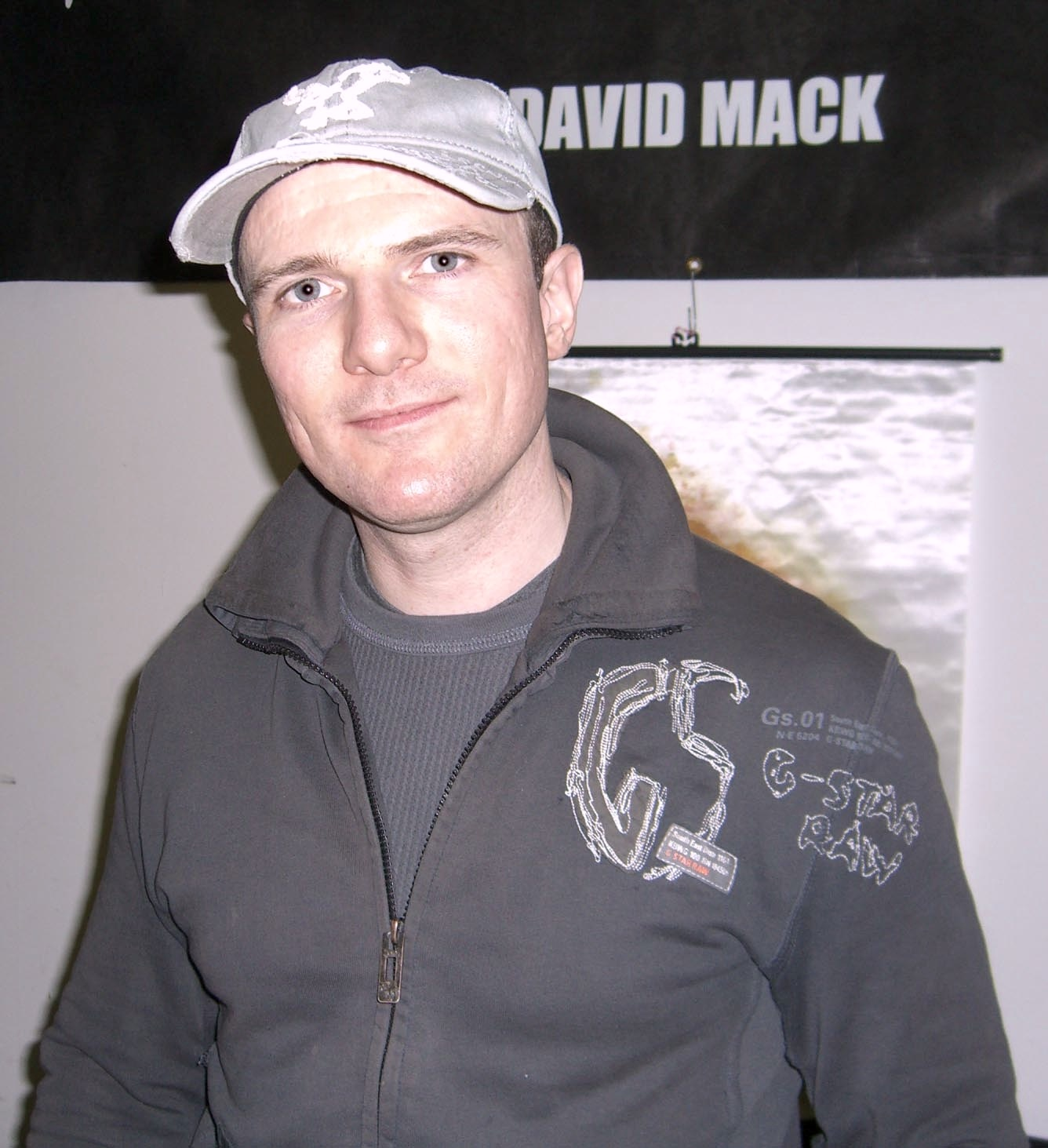
1995 Alumnus artist David W. Mack

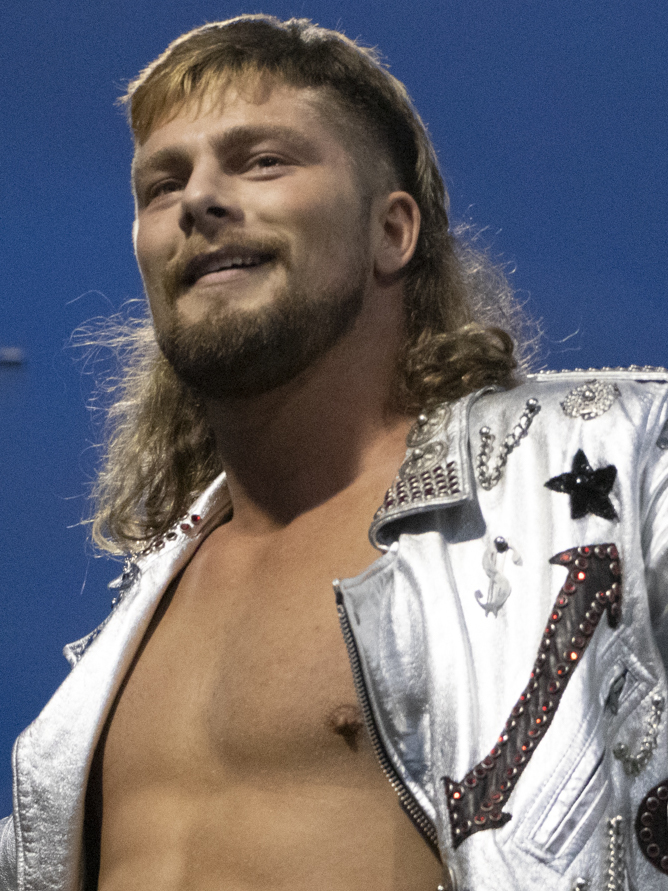
Graduated in Information Systems – professional wrestler Brian Pillman Jr.
