= Doug Worsnop =

Douglas R. Worsnop (born November 1, 1952) is an American atmosphere and hydrospheric scientist, a significant figure in his field, currently at Aerodyne Research and an Elected Fellow of the American Association for the Advancement of Science and the Finnish Society of Sciences and Letters. He graduated from Hope College and Harvard University.
