= SlashNET =

Internet Relay Chat network

- Founded: 1999
- Geographic location: United States; Europe
- Based in: Worldwide
- Website URL: www.slashnet.org
- Primary DNS: irc.slashnet.org
- Average users: 900 - 1,000
- Average channels: 300 - 400
- Average servers: 5
- Content/subject: Public/Unrestricted

SlashNET is a medium-sized, independently operated Internet Relay Chat (IRC) network. Originally sponsored by Slashdot and founded in 1998, in 1999 SlashNET split off to become its own entity. A few well-known communities and projects maintain an IRC presence at SlashNET, including #g7 (the IRC idle RPG), #totse (Totse), #idiots-club (ZZT Community), #mefi (a Metafilter-related community), various Penny Arcade-related communities, #Twitterponies (a Twitter roleplaying group), and #rags (an old-style rag calligraphy community). As of 2012 it is ranked in the top 40 networks by IRC.Netsplit.de, with an estimated relatively constant 1700 users, and #25/737 by SearchIRC.com.

== Administration ==
According to SlashNET's website, a "hands-off" approach to administration is used. More specifically, SlashNET claims that IRC Operators are just regular users with a status flag next to their nicknames. SlashNET's administration officially decries the use of mission statements and other business-like "buzzwords" for IRC networks and rejects the notion that these are necessary for the operation of a network. The overall objective of the administration as described by the network's website is "keep the servers running."

SlashNET is run entirely by volunteers from around the globe. SlashNET's servers run UnrealIRCd v3.2.5 on FreeBSD and Linux. IRC services and Blitzed Open Proxy Monitor are also utilized to provide a quality IRC experience for users.

== Forums ==
SlashNET has been host to numerous IRC forums with famous people in the tech industry. This includes Ken Coar, Marcel Gagne, Richard Stallman, Jamie Zawinski, Matt Dillon of DragonflyBSD, Rob 'CmdrTaco' Malda and Jeff 'Hemos' Bates of Slashdot, Rusty Foster and Dylan 'Inoshiro' Griffiths of kuro5hin, and the distributed.net crew. Logs of past forums on SlashNET may be found on the network's website.

== Events ==
SlashNET, as the key communications method for Slashdot staff, was used in selecting and approving stories on the website. On 9/11, Rob Malda, as "Daddy Pants" of the day, with final say on story acceptance, elected to focus Slashdot only on the unfolding news of the attacks. Telephone exchanges and cell networks were overburdened; many reports and eyewitness accounts came in via IRC. Many of these were posted on Slashdot. The site had 3 million page views for the day.
