= Robin Miller (technology journalist) =

American journalist (1952–2018)

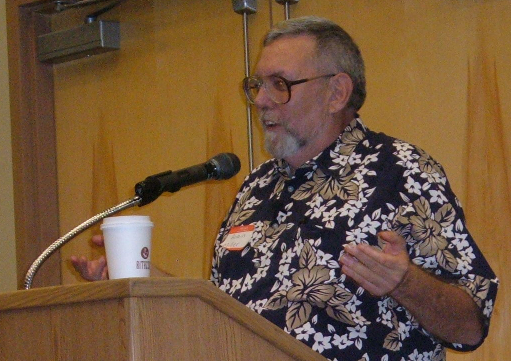
Rob "Roblimo" Miller giving speech at the Florida Linux Show 2008

Robin "Roblimo" Miller (October 30, 1952 – May 24, 2018) was an American journalist specializing in technology who worked for Open Source Technology Group, the company that owned Slashdot, SourceForge.net, freshmeat, Linux.com, NewsForge, and ThinkGeek from 2000 to 2008.

Miller formerly owned Robin's Limousine, a small limo company based in Elkridge, Maryland, the origin of his online nickname. Miller is best known for his involvement with Slashdot, where he was not only the corporate editorial overseer but also Interview Editor.

As a freelancer, Miller wrote for a number of print and online publications including Time.com, Baltimore City Paper, American Medical News, Innkeeping World, Machine Design, The Baltimore Sun, and Rewired.com. Miller is the author of three books: The Online Rules of Successful Companies, Point & Click Linux!, and Point & Click OpenOffice.org, all published by Prentice Hall. His latest ventures revolve around Internet-delivered video, including video software "tours" and tutorials on Linux.com and his recent "side" venture, Internet Video Promotion, Inc.

Miller had been a judge for the Lulu Blooker Prize and was on the online advisory board of the Online Journalism Review of the Annenberg Center for Communication at the University of Southern California.

Miller lived in Bradenton, Florida. He was married with three grown children and three stepchildren.
