= Jeff Bates (technologist) =

American businessman

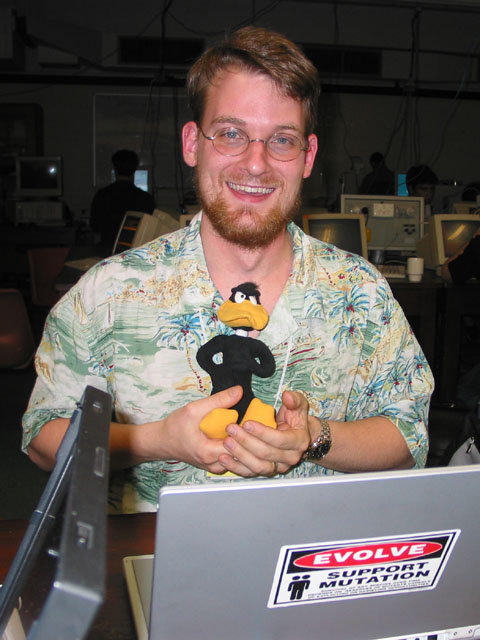
- Bates at linux.conf.au 2003
- Born: March 27, 1976 (age 50)
- Other name: hemos
- Known for: Co-founder of Slashdot

Jeff Bates, also known as hemos, is the co-founder of Slashdot along with Rob Malda ("CmdrTaco").

== Biography ==
Bates graduated from Holland Christian High School in 1994 and received a Bachelor's degree in History and Biology from Hope College in 1998.

Malda and Bates created Slashdot in 1997, while undergraduates at Hope College. In 1999 they sold the site to Andover.net, which was acquired by VA Linux Systems in 2000 (which became SourceForge, Inc. in 2007, then Geeknet, Inc. in 2009).

Bates served as Director of Media Operations for Geeknet from May 2001 through July 2004, when he became Vice President of Editorial Operations and Executive Editor of Slashdot. In February 2008 he became Geeknet's Vice President of Platform and managed the core engineering and product teams for Slashdot, freshmeat, and SourceForge.

In August 2011, Bates joined Google. He worked at Google as Chief of Staff for the CIO, and as of 2019, is the Chief of Product Operations.

== Slashdot ==
Bates and Malda founded technology-related news website "Chips and Dips" in July 1997. It was renamed to Slashdot in September 1997. In 2012, Slashdot had about 3.7 million unique visitors per month and received more than 5300 comments per day.
