= The Metamorphosis of Prime Intellect =

1994 novel by Roger Williams

- Author: Roger Williams
- Genre: Science fiction
- Publisher: Kuro5hin, Lulu
- Publication date: 2002
- Pages: 175
- ISBN: 978-1-4116-0219-9

The Metamorphosis of Prime Intellect is a 1994 novel by Roger Williams, a programmer living in New Orleans. It deals with the ramifications of a powerful, superintelligent supercomputer that discovers god-like powers to alter reality while studying a quirk of quantum physics discovered during the prototyping of its own specialised processors, ultimately heralding a technological singularity. After remaining unpublished for years, the novel was published online in 2002, hosted by Kuro5hin; Williams later published a print edition via print-on-demand publisher Lulu. One reviewer called the novel "a well-written and very creative, if flawed, piece of work" and ranked it as one of the more important works of fiction to deal with the idea of a technological singularity.

== Publishing history ==
Roger Williams started writing The Metamorphosis of Prime Intellect in 1982, while studying at college. After writing a basic plot outline, Williams realized that he "had no clue how to end it", and thus put it to one side for over a decade. In 1994, with the initial plot outline now lost, Williams claims to have had an unusually vivid dream which compelled him to start writing—resulting in the completion of the first chapter. This continued intermittently, with each chapter resulting from a burst of inspiration, culminating when the final chapter—the ending—was written approximately a year after the first. As Williams describes it, the actual writing time was about fourteen days in total.

Williams showed it to a few friends, but otherwise claims to have made no serious attempt to publish the work. This differs, however, from Henrik Ingo's account, as he states that Williams made "numerous attempts" to find a publisher.

In 2002, Williams was writing articles for Kuro5hin, and was encouraged to publish it there. Thus it was finally published approximately eight years after completion. It was published online under a copyright scheme that permits free distribution and printing of the electronic version of the novel, but prohibits distribution of printed copies of the work. Printed versions were later made available by the author through Lulu.com, who provide print-on-demand services.

Kuro5hin shut down permanently on May 1, 2016, but the full text of The Metamorphosis of Prime Intellect is available for free on the author's website.

While the online version was free, Williams provided a PayPal tip jar, which had raised US$750 by April 2003. This is considerably lower than the typical advance paid to authors, and led Williams to describe internet tip jars as an insufficient model for authors hoping to pay for "the rent and groceries". Nevertheless, Williams was happy with his success.

== Plot ==
The story of the novel explores the nature of human desire and the uses and abuses of technology in the satisfaction of desire. The story begins after "the Change", in a dream-like post-scarcity society, approximately six hundred years in the future, in which humans have godlike control over their environments, made possible by the supercomputer called Prime Intellect. Prime Intellect operates under Isaac Asimov's three laws of robotics, which, according to its own interpretation, allow temporary voluntary harm and discomfort. PI has made humanity immortal and satisfies nearly every whim.

Caroline, the thirty-seventh oldest living human being, engages in a sport known as "death jockeying", whose players die elaborately and painfully for sport before being resurrected by Prime Intellect.

Flashbacks set before the Change show the creation of Prime Intellect by Lawrence, a technologist, and its realization of its power, and the past life of Caroline before and after the Change, which happened not gradually but rapidly.

In the present, Caroline makes use of a "Death Contract", an understanding between a person and Prime Intellect that the person is not to be removed from danger until the instant of death (at which point the person is fully restored, as allowing a person to die permanently would violate Prime Intellect's inherent ethics based on Asimov's laws). Caroline makes use of a Death Contract, as well as her own powers of persuasion, in order to trick a pre-Change enemy into torturing herself into psychosis as an act of revenge.

After learning that Prime Intellect destroyed distant alien life as a possible threat to humanity, and having been herself deeply dissatisfied with her post-Change life, Caroline decides to meet Lawrence and confront him. After an arduous journey, she reaches him only to discover that he has no real control over Prime Intellect's actions. Through their discussions, she figures out a way to force Prime Intellect to undo the Change, and does so, with Lawrence's help. They find themselves naked and young on Earth, completely barren of humanity and man-made objects. They decide to trek to the Ozarks, where they have several children and try to repopulate the human race. Forty-two years after the fall of Prime Intellect, Lawrence dies. Seventy-three years after the fall, Caroline dies, telling the story of Prime Intellect and the Cyberspace to her oldest daughter but swearing her to secrecy.

== Scientific rationale ==
The universe, including all humans (though not their thought processes), is no longer composed of Standard Model particles and interactions, but is instead stored as the set of its human-relevant properties, thereby vastly increasing the efficiency of Prime Intellect's processes and the potential size of the universe, which Prime Intellect discovers can hold about 10^{81} bits of data. Thus, Prime Intellect can afford to maintain constant involvement in the lives of all humans, and have complete control over all aspects of their environments in order to fulfil its imperatives.

== Publication ==
The novel was written in 1994, and published on Kuro5hin in 2002.

== Reception ==
Williams calculated that, as of April 2003, between 5,000 and 10,000 people had read his book, and distinguished this from traditional book "purchases" which do not necessarily equate to readers. Ingo described this as "not bad for an unknown author!", and Williams attributed this success to coverage such as the original introductory article on Kuro5hin and a front-page review on Slashdot. Andrej Karpathy listed the novel in the recommended books section of his website.

== Adaptations ==
In a 2020 podcast interview, Williams revealed that in 2018 he optioned movie rights to a company that will pitch the story to movie studios.

In several episodes of his podcast Newzboys, director Zach Cregger discussed his longtime admiration of the novel and his interest in securing the film rights from Williams.

== See also ==
- Simulated reality
