= SPPF =

SPPF may refer to:

- Seychelles People's Progressive Front, a political party in Seychelles
- Société des producteurs de phonogrammes en France; see SourceForge
- Shared Packed Parse Forest, see Earley parser
