= Segfault (website) =

- Website type: Humor
- Website: segfault.org

Segfault (1998–2001) was a popular humor website that posted fake news reports on hacker-related topics on a near-daily basis. The range of topics was approximately the same as that covered and regularly discussed on the Slashdot — including free software, Internet phenomena, computer programming, and technology in general. The name "segfault" refers to the segmentation fault, a computer software error.

Most stories were written and submitted by the site's readers. The site itself was run by Scott James Remnant, who later went on to work on Ubuntu and ChromeOS, and Leonard Richardson. One famous name in the contributor list is Peter Norvig, who submitted the story "Songwriters, Publishers Sue Themselves".

In late 2001, the site shut down after losing its web server. Attempts to relocate the site to a new host failed, as it turned out that the database containing all the stories had been lost and that there were no backups available. The segfault.org domain has subsequently shown messages about the site's status; some have indicated a resurrection attempt being in progress, but nothing appears to have happened.

Some of the content has been recovered and is available via the Internet Archive.

== Stories ==
The following is an excerpt from the Segfault story "Man clicks Internet banner ad":

For the first time in recent memory, someone actually clicked an Internet banner ad. This refutes a previous experiment, in which one thousand monkeys were placed in a room for a year with one thousand Internet-connected computers. None of the monkeys clicked a banner ad (one did write a Shakespearean play, however).

Another Segfault story, "Microsoft Supercomputer Discovers New Integer Between 5 and 6", reported the following:

Scientists at Microsoft's new MS-NeatStuff lab announced today that they have discovered a previously unknown integer, sitting about 2/3 of the way between the integers 5 and 6. The integer, named MS-glef by its discoverer, is claimed to revolutionize all branches of mathematics.

...

Mathematicians around the world are having a hard time accepting this new integer. "It's really kind of embarrassing for them, to think that there was another number right under their noses all along", countered Dr. Thelma Janssen, of Microsoft University. "It will seem weird to teach kids to count ...4...5...MS-glef ...6..., but with our new MS-Math books and MS-Calculators, I'm sure we'll get through it."

The symbol for MS-glef looks something like a "B" and "G" combined with a "$", but cannot be printed yet until Microsoft licenses the new symbol to font packages throughout the world, scheduled for 4th quarter 2001.

== Trolling ==
Many of the Slashdot trolling phenomena posts started out on Segfault. During its earlier days, Segfault would allow anybody viewing the site to comment upon the stories therein. Such comments were visible to any other visitors to the site, and initially tended to expand upon the themes within the story and add to the humor. However, as time went on more of the posts were troll posts (such as naked and petrified posts) which added little to the site. However, Segfault lacked any mechanism to remove trolls and their posts – unlike Slashdot and its moderation system, or Wikipedia's system of peer review.

As a result, the comments became ever more offensive. Eventually the operator of Segfault was forced to disable the comment feature.

== See also ==
- The Onion
