= Foiwe =

Indian multinational information technology company

Foiwe Info Global Solutions
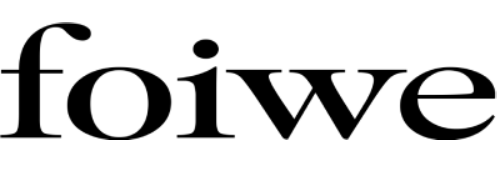
- Type: Private limited
- Industry: IT services, IT consulting, business process outsourcing (BPO)
- Founded: July 7, 2010; 16 years ago
- Founders: Pranballav Howlader; Suman Howlader; Sourav Howlader
- Headquarters: Bangalore, India
- Area served: Worldwide
- Key people: Suman Howlader (CEO); Pranballav Howlader; Sourav Howlader (CTO) (Directors & Founders)
- Services: Software, Business Consulting, Outsourcing, Content Moderation, Trust and Safety, Payroll Outsourcing, Data annotation, BPO
- Number of employees: 1032 (2020)
- Divisions: Foiwe Technology Services; Foiwe Business Services; Enterprise Content Moderation
- Subsidiaries: Howlader Ventures Pvt Ltd; Proflakes Smart Solutions Pvt Ltd; Foiwe PTE LTD; Foiwe Ireland
- Website: www.foiwe.com

Foiwe Info Global Solutions Pvt Ltd is an Indian multinational information technology company that provides Content Moderation, Trust and Safety, business process outsourcing, business consulting, information technology and outsourcing services. The company is founded in Bangalore and also headquartered in Bangalore, India with operations in Singapore and Ireland. The company began in 2010 as a Limited Liability Partnership company and was converted to a Private Limited company in 2019. The company is registered with the Ministry of Corporate Affairs, India.

== History ==
=== Formation ===
Foiwe originated as the business and an IT product development company in Indian and global market. With the expansion of social media and online dating, the firm also entered into the Enterprise content moderation , Trust and Safety, business process outsourcing and IT Services.

Later the company expanded its interests into server monitoring services, application development, and added many small and large organizations to its client list. The small and medium enterprises market segment became the major contributor towards total revenue. The company in 2015 and 2016, brought two outsourcing companies. The group today employs around 1000 employees in different locations.

== Operations ==
Foiwe has offices in India. The headquarters are in Bangalore, Foiwe has delivery centers in Kolkata, Singapore, Ireland, Ahmedabad and Kazan.

Products and Services

Foiwe organizes its services into five main areas: Enterprise Content Moderation, Trust and Safety, payroll outsourcing, Technology, Contact Center Operations, Digital Transformation, and Business Process Outsourcing.

== Principal subsidiaries ==
- Proflakes Smart Solutions Pvt Ltd. is the subsidiary of Foiwe with its head office in Kolkata.
- Howlader Ventures Pvt Ltd, founded in 2013, is the technology subsidiary of Foiwe with its head office in Bangalore.
- FOIWE PTE LTD is the subsidiary of Foiwe based in Singapore.
- Foiwe Ireland in Europe which is subsidiary of Foiwe.
- CarZippi - A doorstep automotive service provider in India.
