= Slash (software) =

Slash (Slashdot-Like Automated Storytelling Homepage) is a content management system, originally created for Slashdot, one of the oldest collaborative sites on the Internet. Slash has also been known as Slashcode.

Slash is a set of modules, plugins and applets — scripts or programs executed by the server — written in Perl.

== History ==
Early versions of Slash were written by Rob Malda, founder of Slashdot, in the spring of 1998. Andover.net bought Slashdot in June 1999. Work was done by Brian Aker, Patrick Galbraith and Chris Nandor, resulting in version 2 of the software, released in 2001. Until 2009, Slash was maintained by Jamie McCarthy and Chris Nandor, among others. The original codebase was abandoned in September 2009.

Rehash remains primarily under the GNU General Public License and anyone can contribute to development.

== SoylentNews ==
Rehash
- Original author: Open Source Technology Group
- Developers: Rehash Developers and the SoylentNews Team
- Repository: github.com/SoylentNews/rehash
- Written in: Perl
- Predecessor: Slash
- Service name: SoylentNews
- Type: Content management system
- License: GNU General Public License
- Website: soylentnews.org

SoylentNews is a fork of Slashdot using a 2009 fork of the Slashdot engine. Michael Casadevall (NCommander), is a former New York Ubuntu core developer, and SoylentNews Public Benefit Corporation (SN PBC) president.

On 22 May 2023 NCommander announced that SoylentNews will be shutting down on 30 June of that year. However, the decision was reversed in an announcement made on 5 June 2023.
