= IControlPad =

Wireless game controller

iControlPad
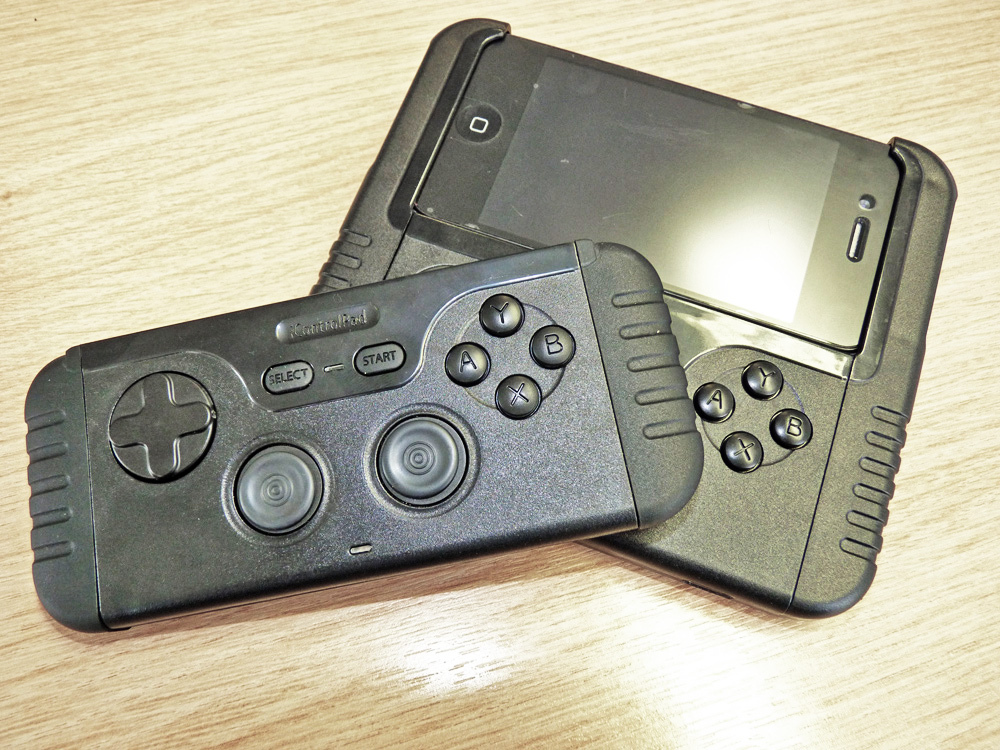
- The iControlPad in its standalone and clamp-on configurations (with iPhone 4).
- Manufacturer: iControlPad Ltd.
- Type: Video game controller
- Input: 8 × Digital buttons (A, B, X, Y, L, R, Start, Select); Digital D-pad; 2 × analog nubs
- Power: 1 × 1500mAH cell
- Website: icontrolpad.com

The iControlPad is a Wireless game controller compatible with a variety of smartphones, tablets, and personal computers. It is designed for use as either a standalone gamepad or attached to appropriately sized devices, such as the iPhone, using a clamp system. Due to this, the iControlPad is able to add traditional physical gaming controls to devices which otherwise rely on inputs such as touchscreens and accelerometers.

== Overview ==
The iControlPad's input controls include an eight-directional D-pad, dual analog nubs, six digital face buttons, and two digital trigger buttons on the gamepad's reverse. The sides of the iControlPad are detachable, with two different attachment types: rubber grips, for using the controller as a standard wireless gamepad; or plastic clamps, for connecting with a suitable handheld, such as a smartphone or iPod Touch. A mini USB port on the bottom of the iControlPad can be used to charge the internal 1500mAh battery, update the device's firmware, and charge attached devices using a USB On-The-Go connection and an appropriate adapter.

The iControlPad, a Bluetooth device, can be run in a wide variety of modes, including as a HID keyboard, mouse, joystick, and gamepad, among others, allowing compatibility with equipment which is limited to only certain types of input. One of the iControlPad's modes mimics the protocol used by the iCade, an arcade cabinet released for the Apple iPad, facilitating compatibility between apps designed for the iCade and the iControlPad hardware.

Due to the iControlPad's ability to operate as a Bluetooth keyboard—by mapping the D-pad and buttons to standard keyboard keys—it is able to communicate with devices such as those running Apple's iOS, including the iPhone and iPad, which do not support Bluetooth gamepads. Since iOS natively supports keyboards, apps can be developed with iControlPad compatibility using either its own protocol or that of the iCade. Thus, the iControlPad is able to control video games and video game console emulators across multiple platforms.

== Development ==
Development of the iControlPad began in 2007, with testing using a hacked SNES gamepad to connect to an iPhone over the dock connection. Once the serial connection was working, the first prototype iControlPad was produced, using a design styled after the Sony PSP. This earliest concept was a one-piece case enveloping the iPhone, with a D-pad on the left side, and four face buttons on the right in a landscape orientation, and was first revealed in 2008.

By November 2009, a completely redesigned iControlPad prototype was under development. This much larger version moved the controls below the screen and added two analog nubs and two trigger buttons to the controller. This design, which featured clamps to attach it to the iPhone, was much closer to the version that was ultimately released, and would soon go into production.

However, one large change was made very late in development. The team had secretly added Bluetooth support to the iControlPad, in order to increase compatibility beyond the iPhone and its proprietary connection. This proved fortunate when Apple began exercising its rights over the dock connector, suing an unlicensed accessory maker. Thus, the iControlPad team were forced to adapt to use the Bluetooth connection for the iPhone, and it was this version which finally became available for order in February 2011.

== Supported apps ==
=== Apple iOS ===
Title	Developer	Release date	Notes
Atari's Greatest Hits ^{a} ^{b}	Atari	06 Apr 2011	Supported since launch.
Compression HD ^{a}	Little White Bear Studios	17 May 2010	Supported since version 1.3.
HungryMaster ^{a}	xionchannel	02 Jul 2011	Supported since version 1.12.
iMAME4All ^{a} ^{c}	David Valdeita	16 Aug 2010	Supported since version 1.7.
IronStar Arena ^{a}	Appracatappra	6 May 2011	Supported since version 02.00.
Mos Speedrun ^{a}	Physmo	06 Apr 2011	Supported since version 1.4.
Sideways Racing ^{a}	Bjango	23 May 2011	Supported since version 1.0.2.
Shuttle Scuttle ^{a}	Embraceware	17 May 2012	Supported since version 1.1.
Velocispider ^{a}	Retro Dreamer	31 May 2011	Supported since version 1.2.
"Flashback: The Quest for Identity" ^{a}	Manomio	18 Aug 2011	Supported since version 1.5.

- ^aSupported via iControlPad's iCade mode.
- ^bOnly on iPad.
- ^cRequires jailbreaking on iOS.

=== Multiplatform ===
Title	Developer	Release date	Platform	Notes
GBC.emu ^{a}	Robert Broglia	23 Apr 2011	Android, iOS, webOS	Supported since launch.
MD.emu ^{a}	Robert Broglia	28 Jun 2011	Android, iOS, webOS	Supported since launch.
NES.emu ^{a}	Robert Broglia	09 Feb 2011	Android, iOS, webOS	Supported since 1.3.13.
PCE.emu ^{a}	Robert Broglia	27 Aug 2010	Android, iOS, webOS	Supported since 1.3.13.
Snes9x EX ^{a}	Robert Broglia	16 Mar 2011	Android, iOS, webOS	Supported since launch.

- ^aRequires jailbreaking on iOS.

== Future releases ==
=== Apple iOS ===
Title	Developer	Release date	Notes
Commodore 64	Manomio	05 Sep 2009	Support expected in next update.
iAmiga	Manomio	TBA	Support expected at launch.
Interstellar Force	David Molnar	10 Mar 2011	Support expected in next update.
No Gravity ^{a}	[realtech VR]	24 Mar 2011	Support now available for iOS/Android and HP webOS.

- ^aSupported via iControlPad's iCade mode.

== Reception ==
Reception for the iControlPad has been mostly positive. Register Hardware noted that while "patience and geekery" were required to get the controller working, the iControlPad "almost perfectly solves the touchscreen game control conundrum". Gadgetoid homed in on the device's usefulness for classic gaming, remarking that it was "awesome [...] for emulation on the go". TouchArcade's reviewer said while playing games with the iControlPad that "the experience feels great", but that "[he couldn't] recommend that the typical gamer run out right now and grab one," due to its limited support on the iTunes App Store.

Early reviews were mixed on the quality of the controls, with DroidGamers describing them as "very loose", while, conversely, Register Hardware said "the analogue nubs and face buttons work extremely well". The controller's responsiveness was later improved by replacing the original rubber keymat with a larger one. In their review, Gadgetoid lauded the inputs as having "a great tactile feel and a liberal amount of travel with a good response."

== iControlPad 2 ==
A successor, the iControlPad 2, was successfully funded via Kickstarter in October 2012. As of November 2013, it has been cancelled, and the backers were KickScammed.

== See also ==
- Pandora, a handheld game console developed by the iControlPad team and others
