= Meta-moderation system =

Moderation performed by users in various types of modern message board systems

Meta-moderation is a second level of comment moderation. A user is invited to rate a moderator's decision by being shown a post that was moderated up or down and marking whether the moderator acted fairly. This is used to improve the quality of moderation.

Slashdot and Kuro5hin are two websites with meta-moderation. The GameFAQs message boards used to have it.

== See also ==
- Moderation system
