= Icade (disambiguation) =

Icade is a real estate investment trust.

The term may also refer to:

- ICADE, a brand name of two Spanish schools
- iCade, an accessory for the iPad
