= TDCX =

Singaporean company

- Formerly: Teledirect
- Type: Private
- Industry: Business process outsourcing
- Founded: 1995
- Founder: Laurent Junique
- Headquarters: Singapore
- Area served: Asia, Europe and Latin America
- Services: Customer experience services, sales and digital marketing, content monitoring and moderation

TDCX is a Singapore-based company that provides outsourced customer experience and business-process services. Founded in 1995 by Laurent Junique as Teledirect, it was renamed TDCX in 2019. The company went public on the New York Stock Exchange following an initial public offering and returned to private ownership in 2024.

== History ==
TDCX was founded in Singapore in 1995 by Laurent Junique under the name Teledirect. The company began by providing outsourced call-centre services, handling telephone calls, emails and faxes for its clients. In 1997, Junique sold a 40% stake in the company to advertising group WPP. He bought back the stake in 2018 for approximately $28 million.

In 2019, the company changed its name to TDCX to reflect its expansion beyond call centres into content moderation, marketing and e-commerce support. In October 2021, TDCX raised approximately US$349 million through an initial public offering on the New York Stock Exchange.

In June 2024, TDCX returned to private ownership in a deal that valued the company at slightly more than US$1 billion. Laurent Junique completed the transaction by acquiring the remaining approximately 14% stake in the company.

In 2025, TDCX acquired Open Access BPO, a US-headquartered outsourcing company with locations in the Philippines and Taiwan. Later that year, TDCX acquired data-labeling company SUPA, announcing plans to integrate it into Chemin, its recently launched AI services subsidiary.

== Operations ==
TDCX provides outsourced customer experience and business-process services. Its services cover customer experience, sales and digital marketing, and content monitoring and moderation.

In 2021, TDCX had operations in Asia, Europe and Latin America. At the time, the company operated in ten markets, including Singapore, the Philippines, China, India and Spain. It offered services in more than 20 languages. By 2022, TDCX employed more than 17,000 people across 11 countries and served clients in over 30 languages. In 2023, it opened its 28th campus in Ho Chi Minh City, Vietnam.
