= ICade =

Accessory for the Apple iPad

iCade
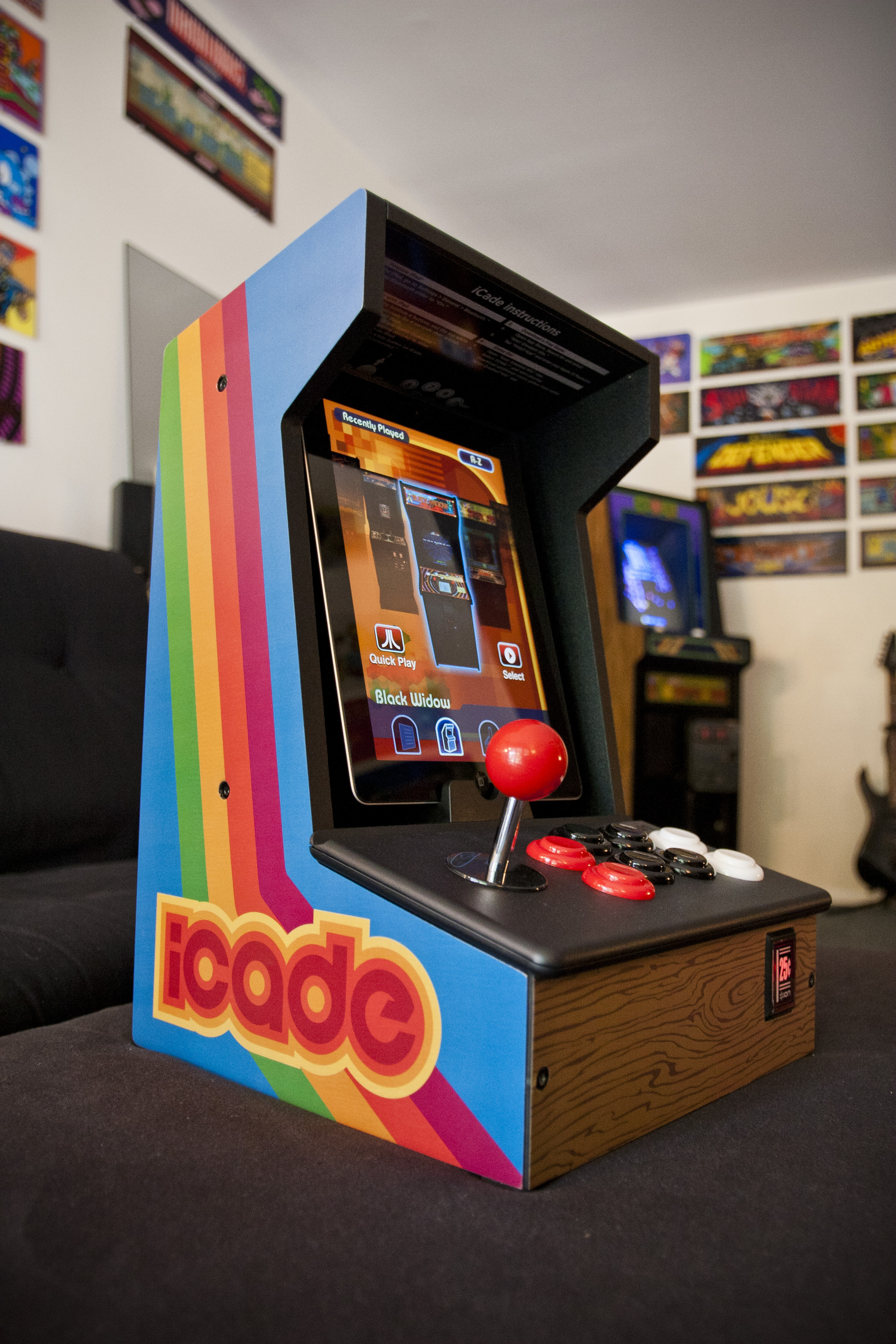
- An iCade with Apple iPad inserted
- Manufacturer: ION Audio
- Type: Desktop arcade cabinet
- Released: US: June 27, 2011
- Input: 1× joystick; 8× digital buttons
- Connectivity: Bluetooth
- Power: 2× AA batteries or 5 volt DC power

The iCade is an accessory for the Apple iPad line of devices which functions as a miniaturized, portable arcade cabinet, including a physical joystick and buttons. The iPad is inserted into the iCade and connects to the device using Bluetooth, allowing it to be used as an arcade-style controller for compatible games.

== Overview ==
The iCade's input devices include an 8-way ball-top joystick and eight digital buttons. When placed inside the iCade, the iPad is positioned vertically, while a groove behind the inputs accommodates landscape-mode play. On the front of the device is a "coin slot", which lights up to show that the iCade is powered on, and flashes when its batteries are running low. Power can be sourced from either two AA batteries or an AC adapter. It is also possible to run an iPad docking cable through the underside of the iCade, in order to charge the iPad during play.

Internally, the iCade is essentially a Bluetooth keyboard—the joystick and buttons are simply mapped to 24 different standard keys. Since the iPad natively supports Bluetooth keyboards, it is able to receive inputs from the iCade without any requirement for special software beyond games designed to respond to the inputs that the iCade sends. This system also allows other Bluetooth input devices, such as the iControlPad, to use the same protocol in order to control applications designed for iCade.

== Development ==
The iCade was originally announced by ThinkGeek on April 1, 2010 as an April Fools' Day prank, however, it was widely covered in electronics media as a potential product, and ThinkGeek responded to this speculation, saying a real iCade was "a possibility". The April Fools' iCade was stated to connect via the standard Apple dock connector, which was noted as a potential blocker for release due to licensing fees and restrictions placed on dock connections by Apple.

Shortly after the revelation of the iCade gag product, ThinkGeek were contacted privately by ION Audio, with a proposal to develop the concept. ThinkGeek and ION staff worked in tandem on the project, and were able to secure support from Atari, rightsholders to a large catalogue of arcade games. Thus, a working iCade, produced by ION Audio, was demonstrated running 1979 arcade title Asteroids at the Consumer Electronics Show in January 2011, with a projected release in "late spring". This version replaced the dock connection with a wireless Bluetooth one, sidestepping potential issues, and the completed device was released on ThinkGeek on June 27, 2011.

ION Audio provides a document which covers the information necessary to add iCade support to applications. This document also includes guidelines for acceptance from Apple, such as avoiding references to the "iCade" name. In addition, iOS app developer Stuart Carnie of Manomio has freely released an unofficial SDK, which application authors can use to speed up implementation of iCade controls. Outside of iOS development, a library has been made available for adding iCade support to Adobe Flash games.

== Pairing ==
As the iCade presents itself as a standard Bluetooth HID keyboard, a numeric passcode must be entered via its buttons and control stick when pairing. While the mapping used for this code entry is quite straightforward, it is not readily apparent on the iCade itself. Thus, it is included here for reference. To put the iCade into pairing mode, hold down the bottom 4 buttons and the top white button (6, 8, 0, and both Enter buttons) simultaneously for 4 seconds, then release them.

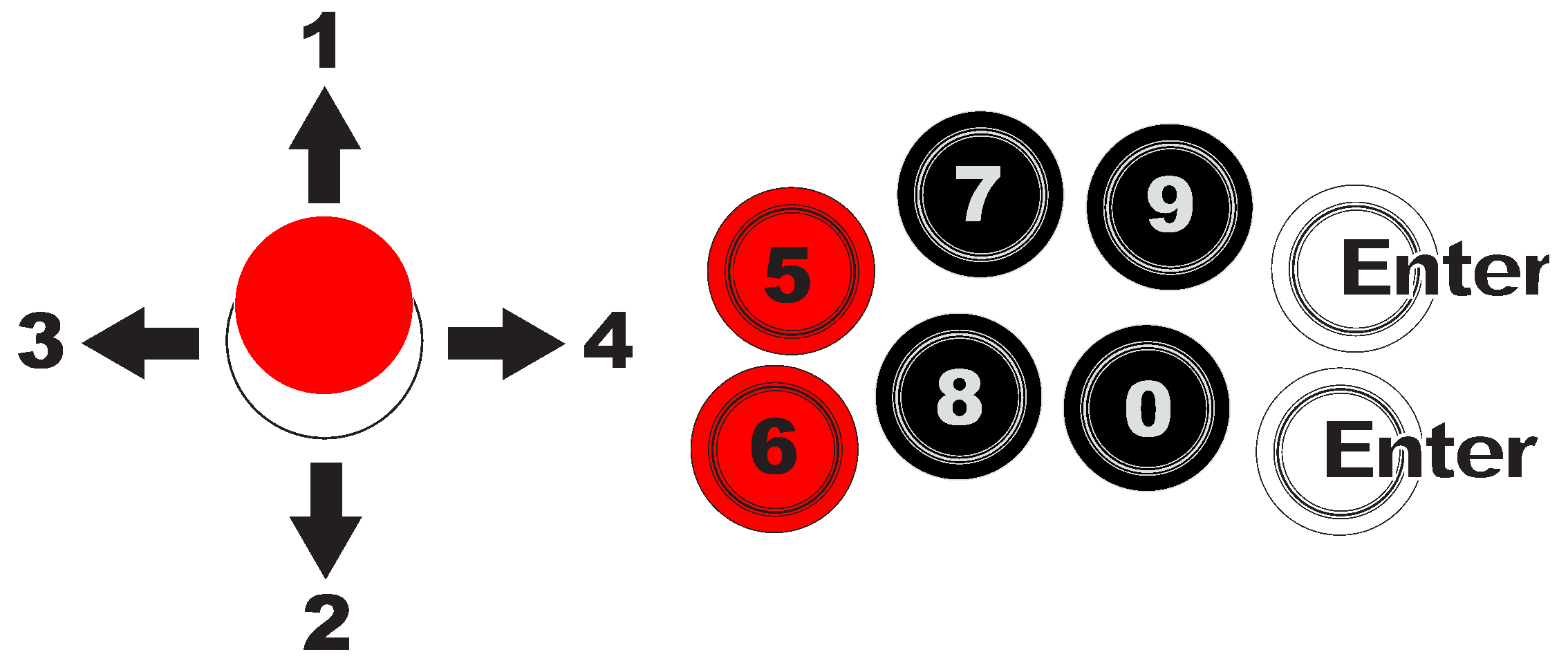
iCade button mapping reference

Button	Key
Stick Up	1
Stick Down	2
Stick Left	3
Stick Right	4
Top Red	5
Bottom Red	6
Top Left Black	7
Bottom Left Black	8
Top Right Black	9
Bottom Right Black	0
Top White	Enter
Bottom White	Enter

== Reception ==
The reception to the iCade itself has been mostly positive. Ars Technica called it "an attractive, capable piece of hardware that does exactly what you want it to do." IGN referred to the iCade as "surprisingly functional", saying it was "certain to please" its target market. TouchArcade felt it was "an absolute must-have iPad accessory for the serious retro gamer." In Engadget's coverage, the accessory was described as "well constructed" and "an awesome addition to your gaming collection."

Feelings about the iCade's controls have been mixed to positive. IGN described the joystick and buttons "responsive", however, noted the input configuration was "a little cramped, but not unbearably so." Ars Technica's reviewer, Ben Kuchera, felt the joystick was "a little looser than [he] would prefer" and the buttons "require[d] a heavy finger to push", but said the controls "held up under [his] heavy hand". TouchArcade praised the buttons, finding them "exactly like those that you'd find on an old Defender cabinet."

The widest criticism for the device has been the small library of compatible software, with many early reviews drawing attention to the fact that only one iCade-compatible title, Atari's Greatest Hits, was available at launch. While speaking positively about the hardware, CrunchReview felt the limited software availability made the device a "one trick pony". IGN opined that "you'd have to be a pretty passionate Lunar Lander, Centipede, or Missile Command fan to not feel disappointed that there isn't more to play on your new $99 iCade."

=== Spin offs ===
Following the iCade Atari and Taito has released their respective versions: the "Atari Arcade" and the "Invadercade". The Atari Arcade connects through a standard dock connector instead of through Bluetooth. The Atari Arcade only works with the Atari's Greatest Hits app which offers 99 games for $10, although it has been criticized as having flimsy controls. Taito's Space Invader themed Invadercade functions as a charger while the iPad is plugged into it. Additionally, the Invadercade has built in speakers and a dedicated volume knob, and can function as a general media center with its iTunes and internet radio functionality. Compatible with both the iPad and iPad 2, the Invadercade similarly requires the Taito's Space Invaders HD app to run.

Icade Jr is a smaller version of the iCade, apps currently are somewhat fully supported yet (see Ion's compatibility list). Runs for about $50 via ThinkGeek and uses either iPhone or iPod Touch.
