= Dice.com =

Career website

- Website type: Job search engine, review site
- Traded as: NYSE: DHX
- Headquarters: New York, NY, U.S.
- Owners: DHI Group, Inc.
- Key people: Art Zeile, president and chief executive officer, DHI Group, Inc.
- Industry: Internet
- Services: Career website
- Website: www.dice.com
- Current status: Active

Dice.com is a career website based in New York City with primary sales and development operations in Urbandale, Iowa and Denver. It serves information technology and engineering professionals, as well as contract and permanent engineering staffing firms. Dice.com is owned by DHI Group, Inc. (NYSE: DHX). Dice.com typically has approximately 80,000 tech job listings. The website claims to have 3 million registered technology professionals and approximately 2.4 million unique visitors each month. Of those registered users, 75% have a bachelor's degree or higher and 65% have 10 or more years of experience in their field.

In June 2009, Dice.com advertised 48,000 jobs. In 2014, Dice.com advertised 80,000 positions daily.

== History ==
Founded in 1990 by Lloyd Linn and Diane Rickert, two former contractors, Dice.com had 175 employees by April 2001. Today, DHI Group, Inc. has 500+ employees worldwide.

Chris Benner, in his 2002 book Work in the new economy: flexible labor markets in Silicon Valley, called Dice.com "[t]he most prominent site in the Silicon Valley high-tech recruiting industry". Dice is an acronym for "Data-processing Independent Consultant's Exchange". In the book, Benner says "the dice imagery actually captures fairly well the type of high-rolling lifestyle that high-end contractors aspire to."

Dice was originally a bulletin board system where recruiters would list open jobs. Dice began operations in the San Francisco Bay Area in 1990. In 1994, the founders moved Dice's headquarters to Des Moines, Iowa. They then launched the URL www.dice.com in 1996. In 1999, Dice opened the career website to direct hiring companies while continuing to serve the recruiting and staffing industry. In February of the same year, it was acquired by EarthWeb.

In 2001, the parent company, Earthweb, changed its name to Dice Inc. In October that same year, Dice.com moved operations to Urbandale, Iowa. In February 2003, Dice Inc. filed for bankruptcy under Chapter 11 to recapitalize, the reason behind was that "EarthWeb had issued a large amount of debt in 2000 that resulted in an unstable corporate structure." By the end of June 2003, Dice came out of bankruptcy eliminating a $69.4 million debt, and re-emerged as a private entity. In 2005, Dice Inc. was acquired by Dice Holdings, Inc. which is owned equally by private equity firms General Atlantic LLC and Quadrangle Group LLC.

In 2007, Dice Holdings completed an initial public offering and its stock began trading on the New York Stock Exchange under the ticker symbol DHX.

In 2015, parent company Dice Holdings changed its name to DHI Group, Inc.

In mid-2017, following an attempt to sell the company to private investors, it was announced that most of the brands were being marketed for sale so the company can focus on growing the technology recruiting efforts of Dice and ClearanceJobs.

== Acquisitions by DHI Group, Inc ==
- ClearanceJobs.com – 2004. A career website, as well as Targeted Job Fairs (targetedjobfairs.com).
- Efinancialcareers.com – 2006.
- AllHealthcareJobs.com - June 2009.
- FINS.com - June 2012. FINS.com now redirects to efinancialcareers.com.
- Slashdot, SourceForge, and Freecode from Geeknet, forming Slashdot Media – September 2012. (Slashdot Media was sold to BIZX, LLC in January 2016.)
- The IT Job Board (TheITJobBoard.co.uk) - August 2013. A business which includes numerous European websites and a targeted marketing business, IT Media.
- getTalent – October 2013. A recruiting startup.

== See also ==
- Employment website
