= We Had to Remove This Post =

2021 Dutch novella

First edition (Dutch)

We Had to Remove This Post (original title in Dutch: Wat wij zagen, lit. 'What we saw') is a 2021 novel by Dutch writer Hanna Bervoets.

== Summary ==
The novel follows the story of Kayleigh, who has recently taken a job as a content moderator for social media platform Hexa after accruing a significant amount of debt. Kayleigh and her co-workers initially form tight bonds, however, as time passes and they are subjected to an ever-increasing amount of violent, conspiratorial, and offensive content while being closely surveilled and graded by the company, their relationships begin to break down.

== Publishing history ==
The novel is the first of Bervoets' works to be published in English, translated by Emma Rault. 600,000 copies of the novel were printed during the first year of its distribution in the Netherlands.

== Themes ==
The novel examines the social impact of social media and the working conditions of social media content moderators.

== Reception ==
Johanna Thomas-Corr of The Sunday Times called the novel "a disturbing page-turner about the parts of the internet we don’t see." Kirkus Reviews described the novel as a "scathing, darkly humorous exploration" that "masterfully captures our contemporary moment without devolving into national politics or soapbox rhetoric."

Houman Barekat of The Guardian said that the novel was "nothing if not timely," pointing to the proposed acquisition of Twitter by Elon Musk, but criticised the novel for offering "little in the way of psychological acuity."
