= Tony Guntharp =

American computer programmer

- Born: May 1969 (age 56–57); Memphis, Tennessee
- Other name: fusion94 (internet handle)
- Occupations: Programmer, author
- Known for: Co-founders of SourceForge
- Website: http://fusion94.org

Tony Guntharp (born May 16, 1969) is an American computer programmer who was the team project manager and one of the four co-founders of SourceForge (along with Uriah Welcome, Tim Perdue and Drew Streib), which launched in November 1999. Prior to this, he had co-founded Fresher Information Corp., an object-oriented database management software firm.

He eventually left VA Software (the owners of the SF property) after it shut down the systems-hardware business.

He also co-authored Practical Linux.

== Damage Studios ==
Later, he founded Damage Studios with several former VA employees, including Greg Kucharo, Steve Westmoreland, Joseph Arruda, San Mehat, Chris DiBona and Craig Ross.
