= Rob Dubbin =

American comedy writer

Rob Dubbin is a comedy writer, programmer and game developer who co-created a popular script-writing platform Scripto while a writer on The Colbert Report.

== Career ==
Dubbin worked on The Harvard Lampoon. He later became a writer and digital producer on The Colbert Report.

Scripto was originally conceived at the end of 2010, when Colbert and Dubbin first discussed making a bespoke drafting program for the writers’ room. Until then, they had using the Electronic News Production System, a platform developed by the Associated Press that did not allow for collaborative writing.

The software was brought to The Late Show with Stephen Colbert, where Dubbin also worked as a writer.

He later become CEO of Scripto.

== Programming ==
Dubbin's preferred programming language is Python due to its mix of text manipulation and forgiveness for lack of code rigor.

Dubbin created a Twitter bot in 2013 known as @oliviataters, which tweeted musings under a guise of a teenage girl. It became popular in part because it was known as the bot most likely to be mistaken as human. It was later suspended by Twitter.

== Personal life ==
Mr. Dubbin is the son of a preschool teacher and a lawyer.

Dubbin married in 2012.
