= Linux.com =

Website owned by the Linux Foundation

- The Linux.com logo in 2019
- Website type: Online newspaper
- Available in: English
- Owner: Linux Foundation
- Revenue: Advertising and store
- Website: www.linux.com
- Commercial: Yes
- Registration: Optional
- Launched: 1999; 27 years ago
- Current status: Online

Linux.com is a website that is owned by the Linux Foundation, where the goal of the site is to provide information about open source technology, careers, best practices, and industry trends. It also acts as a hub for the Linux community. Linux.com offers free Linux tutorials, certifications, news and blogs, discussion forums and groups, a Linux software and hardware directory, and a job board.

The website caters to four different types of Linux users: Developers, DevOps, Enterprise (business and academic), and Enthusiasts.

Additionally, the topics covered include: AI/ML, Cloud, Desktop, Embedded/IOT, Governance, Hardware, Linux, Networking, Open Source, Security, and System Administration.

== History ==
Originally, the site was owned by Andover.net, which was taken over by VA Linux Systems (which later changed into VA Software, and then SourceForge, now Geeknet). It was dedicated to providing news and services to the free and open source software community. The site reported 25 million hits in the first month of operation.

Linux.com suspended the publication of new articles in December 2008, announcing on New Year's Day 2009 that publication would shortly resume after unspecified changes to the site; legal considerations were given as the reason why the anticipated changes were not clearly described.

On March 3, 2009, the Linux Foundation announced that they would be taking over the management of Linux.com.
