= Scripto Enterprises =

American software company

Scripto Enterprises Inc.
- Type: Private
- Industry: Computer software; Screenwriting software
- Founded: January 1, 2014; 12 years ago
- Founders: Stephen Colbert; Rob Dubbin; Evie McGee Colbert
- Headquarters: Studio City, Los Angeles, United States
- Area served: U.S.
- Key people: Josh C. Kline (CEO)
- Products: Scripto; Showrunner
- Number of employees: 9 (2024)
- Website: www.scripto.live

Scripto Enterprises Inc. is an American computer software company based in Studio City, Los Angeles. It offers screenwriting, television production, and narrative video game development software. The company was founded in 2014 by comedian Stephen Colbert, former The Colbert Report writer and coder Rob Dubbin, and Colbert's wife Evie McGee Colbert. The company offers a screenwriting software, also called Scripto, a cloud based collaborative writing platform, developed to address shortcomings in the writing program they were using at the time. The software is used by shows like The Late Show with Stephen Colbert, Last Week Tonight with John Oliver, The Daily Show and SNL's Weekend Update.

== History ==
=== Conception ===
In 2010, Rob Dubbin was a writer for The Colbert Report. To develop its scripts, the show used the Electronic News Production System (ENPS), a suite developed by the Associated Press, which was originally created to be used by news programs and journalists. Host Stephen Colbert and the writing staff were often frustrated by the program, as it did not allow for work to be made by several people, on a document, at the same time. Dubbin described the AP software as "almost more [...] like a networked Word document". Because of the scripted comedy format of the Report, they needed a different workflow than what the ENPS offered. The need for a new software became evident after a mishap on the show, where a script originally featured a joke involving a real life goat, a significant production expense. The bit was cut during revisions, but the production team was not made aware beforehand, and booked the goat anyway. They only realized once the animal was on its way to the studio. At the end of that year Colbert and Dubbin first discussed making a bespoke drafting program for the staff.

=== 2011–2014: Development ===
In 2011, Aside from his writing duties, Dubbin started the process of creating an alternative inspired by Etherpad, with him and Colbert splitting the costs to hire a team of outside programmers. Following a friend's advice, Dubbin posted a banner ad on Reddit saying The Colbert Report was looking for programmers, among the people who responded were Paul Ford and Aaron Swartz. A rough version of the software was introduced slowly and used on the show, "Once every couple weeks, we fixed the thing that went horribly wrong", Dubbin said. By 2013, the software was stable enough that it was used daily for the last two years the show was on the air.

Their first outside show to use the software was Last Week Tonight with John Oliver, after one of The Colbert Report producers had left the show to work on Last Week Tonight, and had recommended Scripto to the staff. At that point, Dubbin saw that other shows were getting interested, and in January 2014, Colbert, Dubbin, and Colbert's wife, Evie McGee-Colbert, founded Scripto Enterprises Inc. as a way to commercialize the software. Scripto's first employee was programmer and media critic Rusty Foster, who joined the staff at the suggestion of Ford, in January 2014. Dubbin said of Foster, "He became sort of the eyes and ears person for all the other shows that were gonna start to use it". That year The Daily Show also incorporated Scripto. Foster noted the software was not SaaS at first: "The first batch of clients got two servers each. It wasn't a cloud thing. We installed a pair of physical servers in their studio".

=== 2015–2020: Establishment ===
When Colbert replaced David Letterman as host of The Late Show on CBS he took the software with him. Dubbin also joined the show through pre-production, and the first season of the show, but left in late 2016 to focus on his job as CEO of Scripto. By late 2015 other shows had licensed the software, including: Full Frontal with Samantha Bee, The Opposition with Jordan Klepper, and The Jim Jefferies Show, among others. An ad for the company ran during the 69th Primetime Emmy Awards, which Colbert hosted, and the software itself was used to write the script for the ceremony.

By late 2017, Dubbin, Foster and their team were beta-testing a new scriptwriting software named Showrunner. The software intended for scripted television, was described by Dubbin as an alternative to Final Draft, "People work in more collaborative teams. They work across the country from each other. There are more people working remotely. And that’s true for creative projects in addition to technological ones. We wanna make a product for those people. So we’re working on it". In 2019, the company hired Alice DuBois to supervise the development of Showrunner, overseeing product and project management, among other things. During the pandemic Scripto was benefitted by the lockdowns as the platform allowed many companies to work remotely. In late 2020 Foster left the company, of his exit, he said: "Like, if the servers at the Late Show die in the middle of the production day I get a text, and it's very stressful. It's been very stressful for a long time. And it came to a point, at the end of last year, it's just like: I can't really do this anymore".

=== 2021–present: Expansion ===
The company struggled during the 2023 WGA strikes, as every production was shut down. After a strategic review, advisor Ethan Jacks suggested they branch out into media outside of variety television. All of three founders agreed with the vision, with Dubbin stepping down as CEO but remaining in the company as head of video games. In April 2024, media entrepreneur Josh C. Kline was named CEO of the company. Kline said that the company was now licensing Scripto to video game and podcast studios, as well as award shows such as the Clios and websites like The Bleacher Report. The company is also studying adapting the service for live events, such as theater, and content creation, as well as how to incorporate integration systems and AI into the platform. Scripto has signed partnership agreements with Adobe and AWS, to develop those strategies.

== Funding ==
Scripto has received funding from the venture capital companies Bloomberg Beta, Calm Company Fund, and angel investor Dan Bomze.

== Chief executive officers ==
- Rob Dubbin (2014–2024)
- Josh C. Kline (2024–present)
