= Rusty Foster =

American programmer and media critic

- Born: July 1976 (age 50)
- Education: College of William & Mary (Note: Dropped out)
- Occupations: Computer programmer; media critic
- Years active: 2007–present
- Spouse: Christina Fischer (m. 2000)
- Children: 3

Rusty Foster (born July 1976) is an American media critic and programmer. He has been described as "something of a Zelig-like figure in internet history, popping up in key roles at various stages in the web’s development." He is the author of Today in Tabs, the founder of Kuro5hin, and the creator of Scoop, a collaborative media application used by several websites. He also helped develop Scripto, the screenwriting software company founded by Stephen Colbert.

In 2013, his Facebook account was subject to a "prank" reporting him dead, drawing the attention of several major news outlets. Since 2013, Foster has written occasionally for The New Yorker magazine.

== Early life ==
Foster was born in July 1976. His father, Lawrence Foster, was a franchise developer for Dunkin' Donuts. He grew up in Plymouth, Massachusetts, and spent summers at his grandparents' cottage on Peaks Island, Maine. Foster graduated from Falmouth Academy in 1994. He enrolled at the College of William & Mary, where he studied physics and film studies before dropping out his senior year. He learned HTML and moved to Washington D.C., where he worked for government agencies.

== Kuro5hin ==
Kuro5hin (K5; read "corrosion") was a collaborative discussion website Foster founded in 1999, inspired by Slashdot. Around 2005, it had tens of thousands of members. On May 1, 2016, the site closed down, with all content taken offline.

== Today in Tabs ==
Foster writes a news media and Internet culture newsletter called Today in Tabs. Its first iteration, which ran from 2013 to 2016, was syndicated on Fastcolabs and Newsweek and had about 12,000 subscribers.

He restarted the newsletter in 2021 on Substack, with a Discord server for subscribers. In 2024, Foster moved the newsletter to Beehiiv, citing Substack's willingness to host extremist speech, including Nazis.

== Personal life ==
While a student at William & Mary, Foster met Christina Fischer, a history major. They married and moved to San Francisco in 2000. In 2001, they moved to Peaks Island, where they live with their three children.
