= Kuro5hin =

Technology-related discussion website (1999–2016)

- Dissolved: October 2013
- Owner: Rusty Foster
- Website: kuro5hin.org
- Users: ~10,000 (2005)
- Launched: December 1999; 26 years ago
- Current status: Offline (May 1, 2016)

Kuro5hin (K5; read "corrosion") was a collaborative discussion website founded by Rusty Foster in 1999, having been inspired by Slashdot. Articles were created and submitted by users and submitted to a queue for evaluation. Site members could vote for or against publishing an article and once the article had reached a certain number of votes, it was published to the site or deleted from the queue. The site has been described as "a free-for-all of news and opinion written by readers". Around 2005, its membership numbered in the tens of thousands.

On May 1, 2016, the site was closed down permanently with all content taken offline. Foster stated at the time that it might return in the form of a static archive at a later date.

== Overview ==
All content was generated and selected by the users themselves, with the exception of site news written by the administrators. Registered users would submit stories to the submissions queue where other users would vote +1 FP (front page), +1, 0, or −1. If the story reached a predetermined threshold score, it was posted to the front page or to the relevant section, depending on the proportion of "FP votes". If it failed to make the threshold, other factors (such as number of comments, type of comments, and their ratings) could still cause the story to be posted to a section or to the front page. Otherwise, it was dropped.

One feature of the story queue was edit mode, in which a story was protected from voting for a period of time during which the author could make changes. Comments could still be made on the story to suggest changes before voting began. These comments were distinguished as being editorial or topical.

A further section was known as the diaries. Having no editing or moderation vetting, diaries were essentially weblogs. and formed the source of most of Kuro5hin's content by volume. However, unlike the edited article sections, they were not widely syndicated. Other users would also comment on these diaries in the same way as stories but without the editorial or topical stipulation.

== History ==
Foster named Kuro5hin—pronounced corrosion—as a pun on his first name. The site was founded in December, 1999. It was powered by the Scoop collaborative system, originally written by Foster himself, with the motto "Technology and Culture, from the Trenches."

In July 2000, the site was temporarily closed due to comment spam and denial-of-service attacks.

In January 2002, OSDN ended the advertising affiliate agreement with Kuro5hin.

In June 2002, Kuro5hin was at risk of shuttering due to lack of funds. Foster reached out to the community asking for money and raised $35,000 in less than a week.

Kuro5hin was permanently closed in May 2016. Internap had shut down the data centre the site was using and a full server migration never happened. At the time, Foster indicated he might create a static archive of the site.

== See also ==
- Adequacy.org
- Advogato
- Digg
- MetaFilter
- Plastic.com
- Reddit
- Slashdot
- Techdirt
