= BizX =

Coordinates: 47°34′43.1″N 122°9′14.4″W

- BizX Logo
- Company type: Private
- Industry: Financial Technology, Barter, Trade Exchange
- Founders: Bob Bagga (Co-founder, CEO) Chris Haddawy (Co-founder, EVP) Raj Kapoor (Non-employee co-founder)
- Area served: Washington, California, Dubai
- Products: Network-based private currency (BizX Dollars)
- Services: Business-to-business trade exchange
- Website: bizx.com

BizX is an American financial technology company that operates a digital private currency (the BizX dollar) that facilitates business-to-business exchange of goods and services.

The company is headquartered in Seattle, Washington, with offices in Oakland, California and Dubai, United Arab Emirates.

BizX was founded in 2002 by Bob Bagga, Chris Haddawy, and Raj Kapoor.

BizX also offers lines of credit to member businesses at the rate of 1.5% per month (18% annually), payable in BizX dollars.

== See also ==
- Barter
- Financial technology
