= UnrealIRCd =

Open-source IRC daemon

- Original author: Carsten V. Munk (stskeeps)
- Developers: Bram Matthys (Syzop) and others
- Release: May 1999; 27 years ago
- Stable release: 6.2.7.1 / 7 November 2026; 10 days ago
- Written in: C
- Platform: Linux, BSD, Mac OS X, Solaris, HP-UX, Windows
- Type: IRCd
- License: GPLv2 or later
- Website: www.unrealircd.org

UnrealIRCd is an open-source IRC daemon, originally based on DreamForge, and is available for Unix-like operating systems and Windows. Since the beginning of development on UnrealIRCd c. May 1999, many new features have been added and modified, including advanced security features and bug fixes, and it has become a popular server. The latest stable version is 6.2.1, released in 2025, with ongoing development in the 6.2.x series.

== Development ==
UnrealIRCd was originally based on DALnet's DreamForge IRCd, "a now deprecated IRC server that was the predecessor to the actively maintained Bahamut server."

On July 13, 2007, Carsten V. Munk (stskeeps), the founder of the UnrealIRCd project, announced that a future v4.0 would be a fork of InspIRCd. Later on, this idea was dropped.

With the release of version 3.2.10 in December 2012, Bram Matthys (Syzop), the current project leader of UnrealIRCd, announced that development has been started on a 3.4 version. The 3.2 series will be maintained until the new version has been declared stable, which was expected to happen somewhere in 2014. In October 2015 it was announced that due to the many changes the new series will be called UnrealIRCd 4 and the first Release Candidate was made available for download. An UnrealIRCd 4.0.0 stable release was made on December 24, 2015. Next UnrealIRCd 5 stable series was first released on December 13, 2019.

The current stable series, UnrealIRCd 6, was first released in December 2021. It introduced a major rewrite with modular architecture, JSON-RPC API, improved security, and IRCv3 support. Subsequent versions in the 6.x series have focused on performance optimizations, such as significant CPU reductions for SSL/TLS operations and hub server improvements, as well as enhanced security features like UTF8-only mode, advanced spam filtering, and support for multiple TLS certificates including post-quantum cryptography. UnrealIRCd 6.2.1, released in 2025, included major performance overhauls and new features like away reason fields and webhook logging for events. Development continues in the 6.2.x series, with no EOL date announced for the 6.x branch.

== Features ==
Some of Unreal's features are referred to as "nonstandard", in that they are not listed in the IRC-related RFCs 1459 and 2811–2813, but are beneficial "from a security point of view." The software "possibly has the most security features of any IRC server", including "spam filters, different styles of user bans, various channel modes to prevent abuse and flooding, SSL (Secure Sockets Layer) connection support, and compressed server connections." For example, the shun command blocks a user from transmitting any text, the spamfilter uses regular expressions and can automatically ban, shun or disconnect users, and dccdeny can block files from being transmitted. It includes the ability to password-protect server restart and stop commands, for operator use only. The Windows version includes error reporting on startup. Unreal supports linking to IRC Services, and allowing Services to change channel modes. Server-side filtering can be used by administrators to block transfers of files, or certain domains.

Unreal 3.2's "new-style" configuration file format is described as "more verbose" than traditional IRCd servers, which makes it easier set up; it is divided into "blocks" of related options, and has explanatory comments for each option.

In modern versions (6.x), UnrealIRCd includes performance optimizations, such as reduced CPU usage for SSL/TLS writes and faster hub server processing. Security enhancements include channel flood protection enabled by default, UTF8-only mode for all traffic, and support for multiple TLS certificates. It also supports IRCv3 features like network icons and extended ISUPPORT, as well as JSON-RPC API for integrations and webhook logging for events.

=== Admin WebPanel ===
UnrealIRCd 6 introduced the Admin WebPanel, a web-based graphical interface for managing IRC servers. It provides administrators with an overview of the network, including servers, users, and channels. Key features include:

- Real-time monitoring of connections, traffic, and events.
- Administrative tasks such as adding/removing bans (K-lines, Z-lines), managing spamfilters, and editing server configurations via JSON-RPC.
- User management with file-based or SQL authentication.
- Plugin system for extensions, including updates via the web interface.
- Mobile-friendly responsive design.

The WebPanel requires UnrealIRCd 6.0.6+ and communicates over HTTPS via JSON-RPC. It is built with PHP and can run on the same server or remotely, enhancing usability for administrators without command-line access.

== Reception ==
UnrealIRCd is "one of the most popular and full-featured IRC daemons" and is used on the largest number of IRC servers, according to SearchIRC.com. This server is described as having "possibly the most security features of any IRC server."

== Security issues ==
The tarball of version 3.2.8.1, from November 2009 to June 12, 2010, contained a trojan that allowed people to execute commands with the privileges of the user running the daemon, regardless of any user restrictions. The problem was fixed - the current tarball download is not suspected to contain a trojan. The attack was attributed to the group Ac1db1tch3z.

The "Firefox XPS" cross-protocol JavaScript-based attack on IRC networks was reported in January 2010; UnrealIRCd developers later released a patch to set its anti-spoofing configuration parameter to "on" - the default was previously "off" - and "kill/zline/etc such connections". It is the first question in the configuration file.

As of 2025, UnrealIRCd maintains a proactive security policy, supporting only the latest stable release (6.2.1) for security fixes. Vulnerabilities are reported privately via the bug tracker. The policy emphasizes regular audits and community reporting, with no known active vulnerabilities in the 6.x series.

== See also ==
- Internet Relay Chat
