= BPO =

BPO can refer to:

== Orchestras ==
- Belgrade Philharmonic Orchestra
- Berlin Philharmonic Orchestra
- Boston Philharmonic Orchestra
- Brisbane Philharmonic Orchestra
- Brooklyn Philharmonic Orchestra
- Brussels Philharmonic Orchestra
- Budapest Philharmonic Orchestra
- Buffalo Philharmonic Orchestra

== Business and finance ==
- British Post Office, former postal and telephone service provider
- Bank payment obligation
- Broker's price opinion, in real estate
- Business process outsourcing, via call centres etc.

== Other uses ==
- Aviation unit of the Federal Police (Germany) (German: Bundespolizei) (ICAO code: BPO)
- Benzoyl peroxide
- Body part as object, in performing a mime
