= ClearanceJobs =

US-based career website

ClearanceJobs is a career website based in Urbandale, Iowa. It serves individuals with active federal security clearances and provides a secure forum for employers to recruit cleared employees.

ClearanceJobs is owned by DHI Group, Inc. (formerly known as Dice Holdings, Inc.) (NYSE: DHX). The website ClearanceJobs.com typically has more than 40,500 security clearance job listings, but companies frequently use the site to search for candidates, rather than posting jobs. Careers listed on the site range from custodial worker to counterintelligence analyst and cyber counterterrorism targeting analyst.

== History ==
ClearanceJobs was founded in July 2002 by Evan Lesser and his wife. While they had the idea as early as the late 1990s while living and working in Northern Virginia, they didn't launch the site until 2002, after they moved to Atlanta and were spurred on by the need for qualified cleared talent following 9/11.

On September 16, 2004, ClearanceJobs was acquired by DHI Group, Inc.
