= ThinkGeek =

Defunct American online retailer

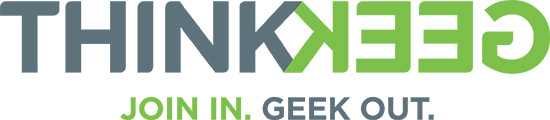
- Type: Subsidiary
- Industry: Retail
- Founded: August 13, 1999; 27 years ago
- Defunct: 2021; 5 years ago
- Fate: Acquired by GameStop
- Headquarters: Grapevine, Texas, United States
- Parent: Geeknet (2000–2021)
- Website: Official website

ThinkGeek logo from 1999 to 2014

ThinkGeek was an American retailer that catered to computer enthusiasts and "geek culture". Described as a "Sharper Image for sysadmins", their merchandise has been likened to "toys for adults, novelties designed to appeal to both your inner child and your inner grad student." These include clothing, electronic and scientific gadgets, unusual computer peripherals, office toys, pet toys, child toys, and caffeinated drinks and candy. ThinkGeek was founded in 1999 and was based in Fairfax, Virginia. The brand is currently owned by Geeknet, a subsidiary of GameStop.

== History ==
ThinkGeek was founded in 1999, and originally based in downtown McLean, Virginia. The company was founded by Jen Frazier, Jon Sime, Scott Smith, and Willie Vadnais, all of whom were running a small Internet startup at the time, with ThinkGeek initially starting as a side project. The website's official launch date was August 13, 1999. Andover.net, a Boston area technology news publisher, acquired ThinkGeek in October 1999. Only a few months later Andover.net was acquired by VA Linux, a California-based tech company that specialized in Linux hardware and software products. VA Linux, after several name changes, became Geeknet.

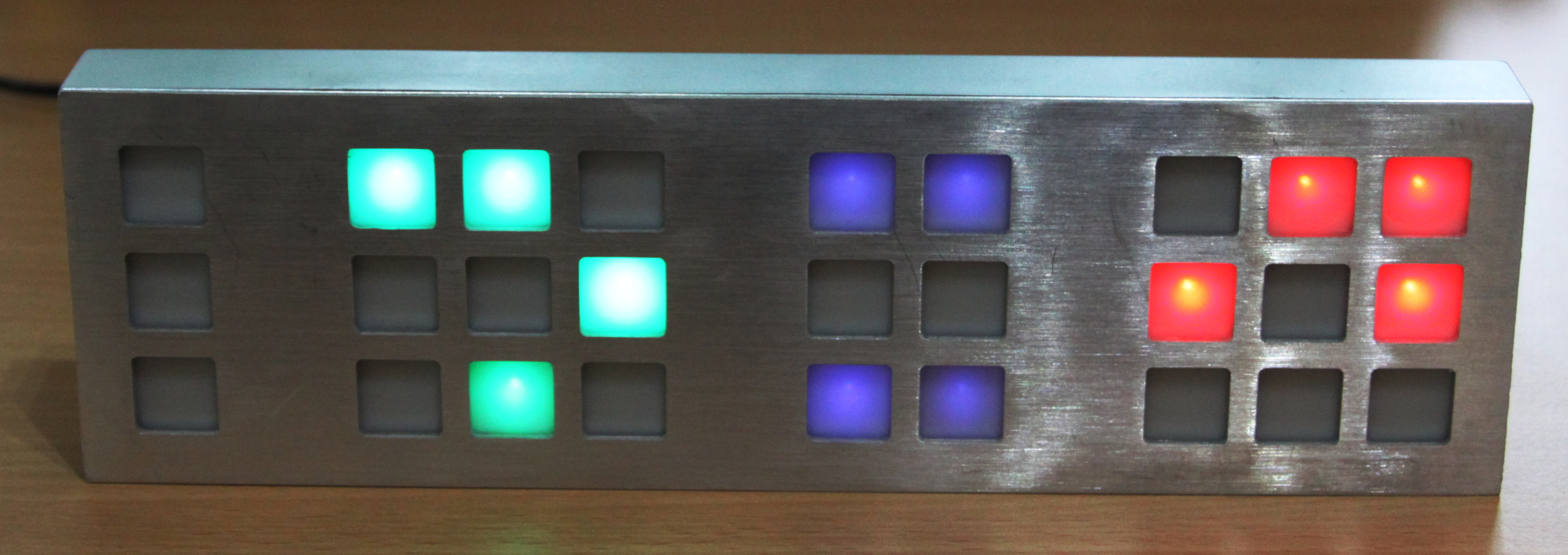
A 2006 TIX LED clock from ThinkGeek

In August 2000, the company moved its offices to Fairfax, Virginia. ThinkGeek grew steadily and increased the number of employees from six in 2004 up to 83 in 2013. Company revenues also increased during this time period, reaching $50 million in sales in 2009 and $118.9 million in 2012. In 2012, ThinkGeek was ranked as one of the top online retailers, listing as #175 on the Internet Retailer Top 500 List.

ThinkGeek's mascot was a monkey named Timmy.

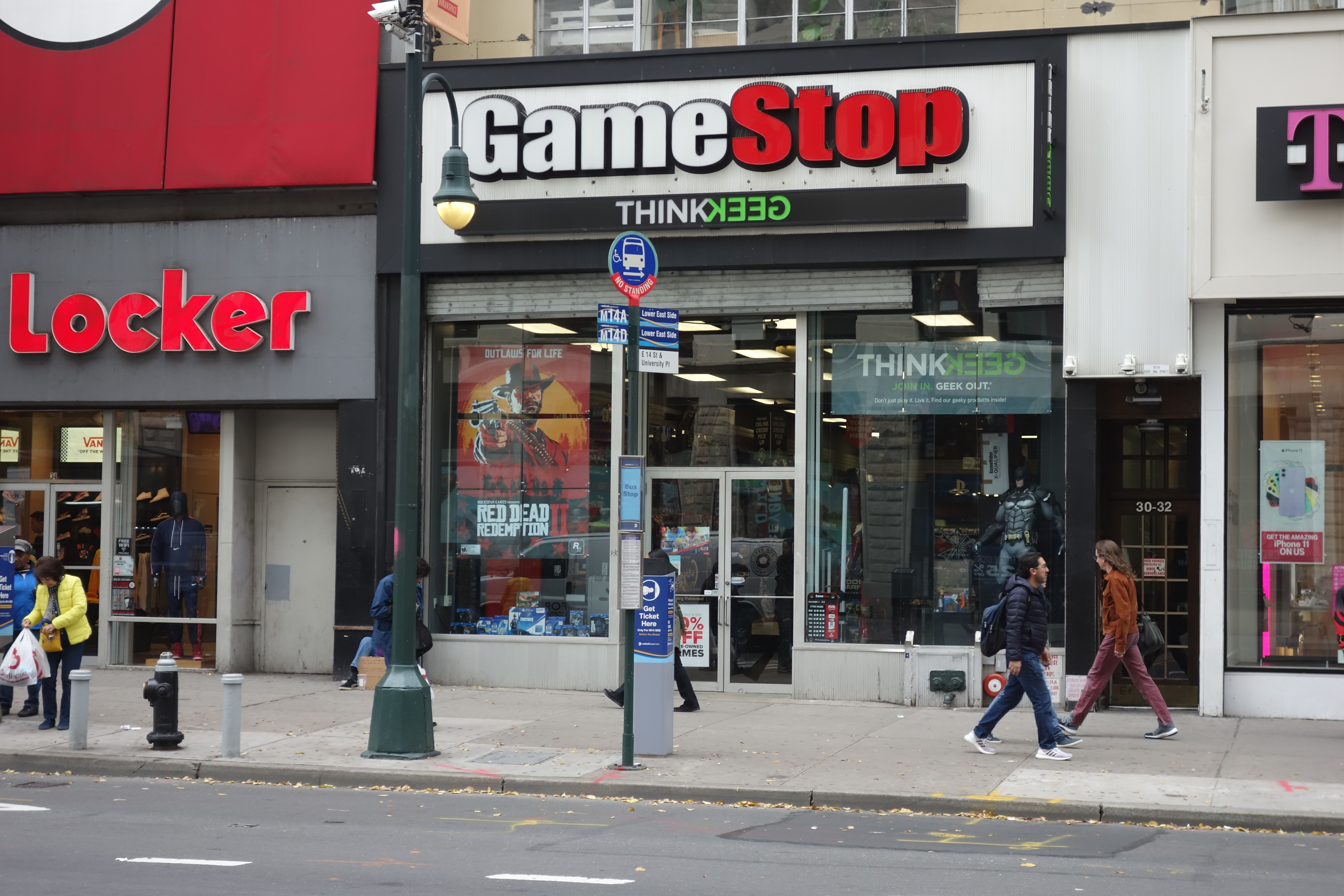
A combined GameStop–ThinkGeek store in New York City in 2019

On May 26, 2015, it was announced that pop culture-oriented retailer Hot Topic had made an offer to acquire Geeknet and ThinkGeek for $17.50 per-share, valuing the company at $122 million. However, on May 29, 2015, it was revealed that an unspecified company had made a counter-offer of $20 per-share; Hot Topic was given until June 1, 2015, to exceed this new offer. On June 2, 2015, it was announced that video game retail chain GameStop had acquired Geeknet for $140 million. The deal was completed on July 17, 2015.

On September 25, 2015, ThinkGeek opened its first retail store at The Florida Mall in Orlando, Florida. In 2016, ThinkGeek opened 25 more physical stores in the U.S., along with 25 international stores. The retailer said they were "committed to creating a seamless omnichannel experience for its customers", including store pickups and ship-to-store options.

In June 2019, ThinkGeek announced that it would be discontinuing its online store, and integrating its e-commerce operations into a "curated selection" of GameStop's online operations. New product details from after the standalone site closed were made public in January 2020, including Jigglypuff and Get Schwifty (from Rick and Morty) themed Bluetooth Speakers.

The Miami location closed in January 2021. In July 2021, the North Star Mall location in San Antonio, Texas closed. In August 2021, the Austin, Texas; El Paso, Texas; McAllen, Texas; and Tacoma, Washington locations announced on social media that they would be closing on September 26, 2021.

== Products ==
After its acquisition by GameStop, most of ThinkGeek's merchandise was licensed from various science fiction and fantasy media franchises such as Star Wars, Star Trek, Firefly, Marvel Comics, Doctor Who, Minecraft, and The Big Bang Theory. Other products offered by the company include classic pop cultural icons like the Magic 8 Ball, or products inspired by science, such as a Schrödinger's Cat Executive Decision Maker. Prior to the acquisition, ThinkGeek curated a collection of many unique products, especially for the time; such as Miracleberry tablets, a t-shirt with integrated sound effects, and virtual keyboards, well before other retailers stocked such items.

ThinkGeek was known for its April Fool's Day gags, wherein the site would post a series of fictional, unconventional products referencing popular culture, such as the "Banksy Toaster" (which burns pictures of Banksy artwork into toast), "Where's Barb?" (a Stranger Things-themed parody of Where's Waldo?), "Nerf Nuke", and the "Thor Mighty Mjolnir Mailbox". Some of the more popular items, however, were made into actual products, such as "Canned Unicorn Meat", the cecaelia-themed "Tentacuddle Blanket", the Tauntaun sleeping bag, and the "Technomancer Hoodie".

ThinkGeek ran a points-for-reward system called "Geek Points", under which customers could earn rewards for buying more products.
