= Manomio =

Mobile game developer

- Industry: retro gaming software
- Founded: 2008
- Founder: Stuart Carnie; Brian Lyscarz.
- Website: www.manomio.com

Manomio LLC is a small US based independent mobile game developer with a focus on retro gaming on the iOS and Android operating systems. The company was founded in 2008 by Australian developer Stuart Carnie and Danish entrepreneur Brian Lyscarz.

== History ==
In June 2009, Manomio submitted a Commodore 64 emulator to the iPhone App Store; the application was rejected due to the use of interpreted or executable code. The emulator was finally accepted in early September, although it was removed from the App Store two days later because it was discovered to have the capability for users to run and create BASIC programs. Prior to its removal, the Commodore 64 emulator app had risen into the top 20 in the "paid apps" section, after only two days of sales. Manomio quickly submitted a new version of the application without BASIC capabilities. The company's success with the Commodore 64 application lead to other emulator releases, such as ones for the Amiga 500 and the Atari 2600.
