= Société des producteurs de phonogrammes en France =

French music rights company

The Société civile des Producteurs de Phonogrammes en France (SPPF, English: Civil Society of Producers of Phonograms in France) is a rights management company for music producers, similar to the Société civile des producteurs phonographiques. According to GfK, its catalog represented 23.3% of physical sales and 31% of streaming in France in 2018.
