= Freecode =

Website

- Website type: Software
- Available in: English only
- Owners: BIZX, LLC
- Creator: Patrick Lenz (scoop)
- Website: freecode.com
- Commercial: Yes
- Registration: Optional
- Current status: Inactive

Freecode, formerly Freshmeat, was a website owned by BIZX, Inc., hosting mainly open-source software for programmers and developers. Among other things, the site also hosted user reviews and discussions. While a majority of the software covered is open source for Unix-like systems, Freecode also covered releases of closed-source, commercial and cross-platform software on Mac OS X and handhelds. Freecode was notable for its age, having started in 1997 as the first web-based aggregator of software releases.

The site was renamed from "Freshmeat" to "Freecode" on October 29, 2011, and in September 2012, Dice Holdings acquired the website from Geeknet.

Purportedly as a result of low traffic levels, the site is no longer being updated as of June 18, 2014. Because many of the linked software projects are otherwise difficult to find, the site contents have been kept online. After Open Source Initiative co-founder Eric S. Raymond called for a replacement, freshcode.club was created and is accepting submissions.

On January 27, 2016, Freecode was sold, along with SourceForge and Slashdot, to current owners BIZX, Inc. The site remained in its archived state.

Since 2023, Freecode redirects to the SourceForge homepage, while freshcode.club is still maintained.

== See also ==
- SourceForge
- List of free software project directories
