= Rob Malda =

American businessman (born 1976)

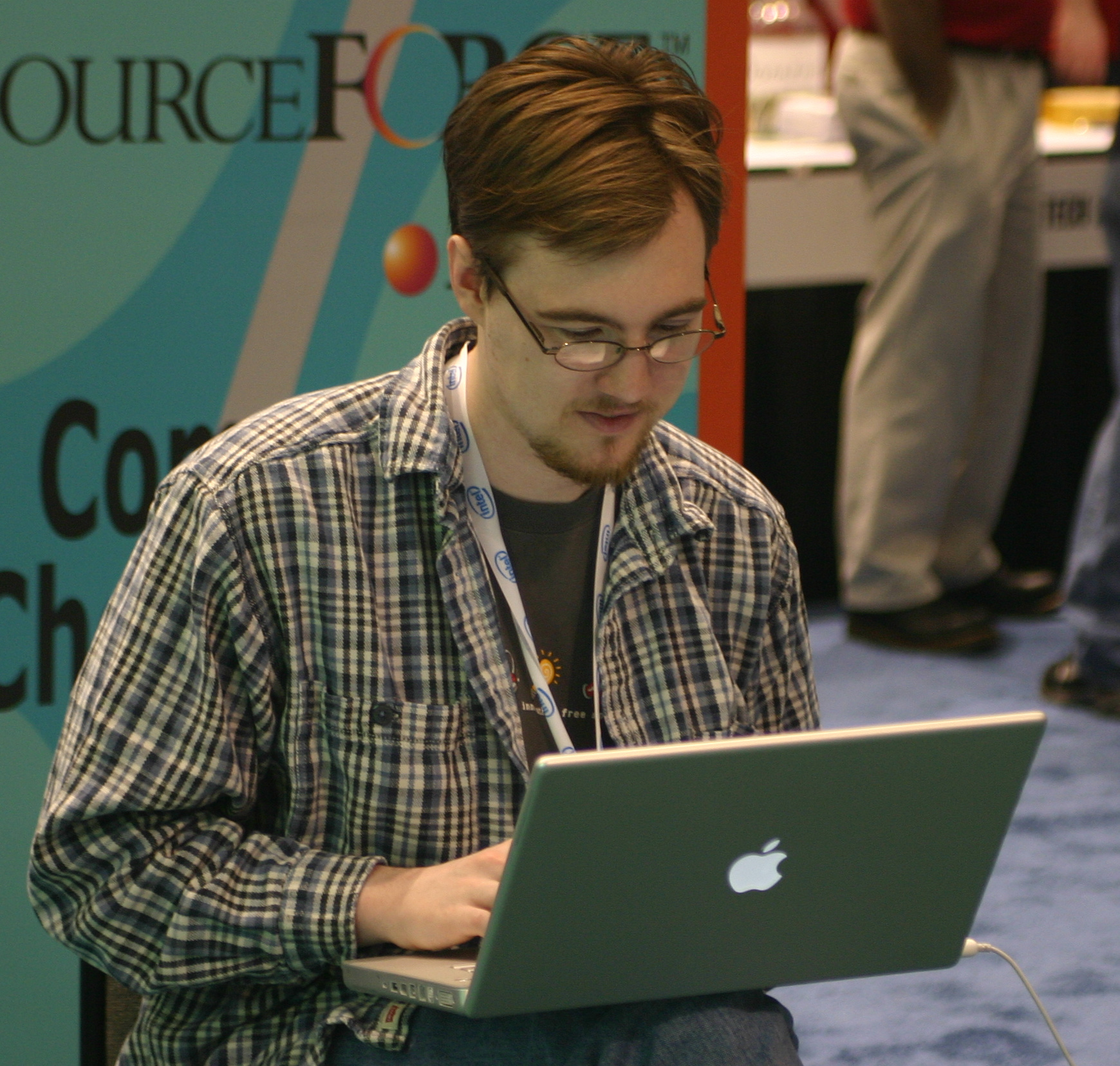
- Malda at LinuxWorld in Boston, 2006
- Born: May 10, 1976 (age 50); Holland, Michigan, United States
- Other name: CmdrTaco
- Occupations: Author, former editor of Slashdot
- Known for: Co-founder of Slashdot
- Spouse: Kathleen Fent (m. 2002)

Rob Malda (born May 10, 1976), also known as CmdrTaco, is an American Internet content author, and former editor-in-chief of the website Slashdot.

== Career ==
Malda is an alumnus of Hope College and Holland Christian High School.

In 1997, he and Jeff Bates created Slashdot while undergraduates of Hope College. After running the site for two years "on a shoestring", they sold the site to Andover.net, which was later acquired by VA Linux Systems. Malda ran the site out of the SourceForge, Inc. office in Dexter, Michigan.

Malda also wrote a monthly column for Computer Power User. In 2002, he was named in the MIT Technology Review TR100 as one of the top 100 innovators in the world under the age of 35.

On August 25, 2011, Malda announced his resignation from Slashdot.

On March 5, 2012, he was appointed as chief strategist and editor-at-large of WaPo Labs, a subsidiary of The Washington Post Company. After The Washington Post Company sold its newspaper operations to Amazon.com CEO Jeff Bezos, it rebranded as Graham Holdings Company. WaPo Labs became Trove, for which Malda was chief strategist and head of product, before shutting down in December, 2015.

== Personal life ==
Malda proposed to longtime girlfriend Kathleen Fent using the front page of Slashdot on February 14, 2002. They were married on December 8, 2002, in Las Vegas, Nevada.
