= Geeknet =

American company

- Formerly: VA Research (1993–1999); VA Linux Systems (1999–2001); VA Software (2001–2007); SourceForge (2007–2009)
- Type: Defunct
- Industry: Online media Retail
- Founded: November 1993; 33 years ago
- Founder: Larry Augustin & James Vera (VA Research)
- Defunct: July 17, 2015; 11 years ago
- Fate: Acquired by GameStop
- Headquarters: Fairfax County, Virginia
- Key people: Kathryn McCarthy (CEO)

Geeknet was a company focused on selling products appealing to the "geek" community, including items related to movies, TV shows, and video games. In July 2015, it was acquired by GameStop.

The company was called VA Research from 1993 to 1999, VA Linux Systems from 1999 to 2001, VA Software from 2001 to 2007, and SourceForge from 2007 to 2009.

== History ==
=== VA Research ===
VA Research was founded in November 1993 by Stanford University graduate student Larry Augustin and James Vera. Augustin was a Stanford colleague of Jerry Yang and David Filo, the founders of Yahoo!. VA Research started to build and sell personal computer systems installed with the Linux operating system, as an alternative to more expensive Unix workstations that were available at the time. During its initial years of operation, the business was profitable and grew quickly, with over $100 million in sales and a 10% profit margin in 1998. It was a significant vendor of pre-installed Linux computers, with approximately 20% of the Linux hardware market.

In October 1998, the company received investments of $5.4 million from Intel and Sequoia Capital.

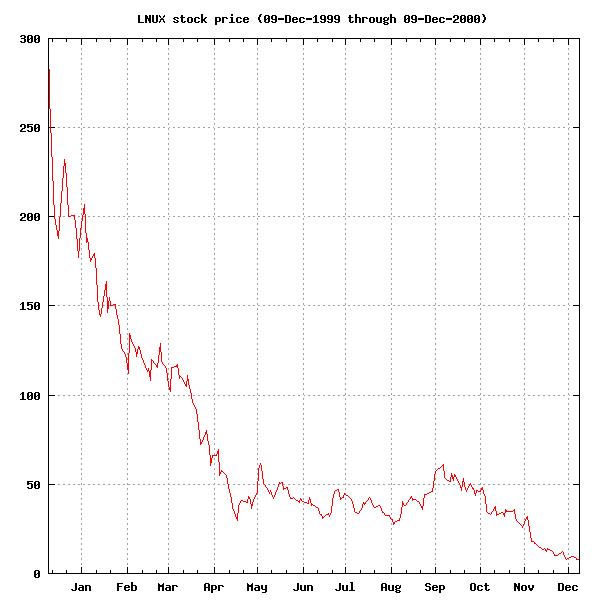
LNUX stock price (9 December 1999 through 9 December 2000)

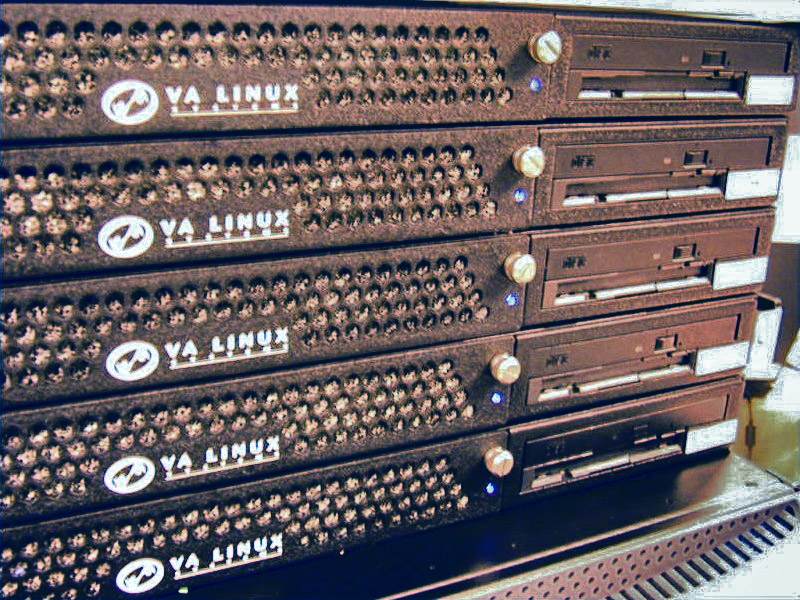
VA Linux servers

In March and April 1999, VA Research purchased Enlightenment Solutions, marketing company Electric Lichen L.L.C., and VA's top competitor, Linux Hardware Solutions. That year, VA Research also won a business-plan competition for the right to operate the linux.com domain. In May 1999, VA created a Linux Labs division, hiring former linux.com domain holder and programmer Fred van Kempen, and programmers Jon "maddog" Hall, Geoff "Mandrake" Harrison, Jeremy Allison, Richard Morrell (who would later create Smoothwall as a project at VA Linux) and San "nettwerk" Mehat. In the summer of 1999, programmers Tony Guntharp, Uriah Welcome, Tim Perdue and Drew Streib began designing and developing SourceForge. SourceForge was released to the public at Comdex on November 17, 1999. VA began porting Linux to the new IA-64 processor architecture in earnest. Intel and Sequoia, along with Silicon Graphics and other investors, added an additional $25 million investment in June 1999.

The company's customers included Akamai Technologies and eToys.com.

The company changed its name to VA Linux Systems. On December 9, 1999, the company became a public company via an initial public offering. The company raised $132 million, offering shares at $30/share, but the shares opened for trading at $299/share, before closing at $239.25/share, or 698% above the IPO price, breaking a record for the largest first day gain. Larry Augustin, the 38-year old founder and chief executive officer of the company, became a billionaire on paper and a 26-year old web developer at the company said she was worth $10 million on paper. By August 2000, the shares were trading at $40 each and only 24 mutual funds held the stock. On December 8, 2000, one year later, after the bursting of the dot com bubble, shares traded at $8.49/share. In January 2001, the stock traded at $7.13/share. By December 2002, it was worth just $1.19/share.

On February 3, 2000, the company announced that it was acquiring Andover.net for $800 million, a month after it became a public company. This acquisition gave VA Linux popular online media properties such as Slashdot, Andover News Network, Freshmeat, NewsForge (became a mirror of linux.com in 2007, mirrors geeknet.com since 2010), linux.com, ThinkGeek, and a variety of online software development resources. With this acquisition came a stable of writers such as Rob Malda, Robin Miller (Roblimo), Jack Bryar, Rod Amis, Jon Katz, and "CowboyNeal". The acquisition eventually allowed the company to shift its business model from Linux-based product sales to specialty media and software development support.

In September 2000, in partnership with Sumitomo Corporation, the company created a Japanese subsidiary, VA Linux Systems Japan KK, to promote Linux systems in Japan.

The company's sales grew to $17.7 million in 1999, up from $5.5 million in fiscal 1998. In fiscal 2000, the company's sales were $120.3 million.

In December 2000, the company launched SourceForge OnSite.

=== VA Software ===
By 2001, VA Linux's original equipment and systems business model encountered stiff competition from other hardware vendors, such as Dell, that now offered Linux as a pre-installed operating system.

By January 2001, the company' stock price traded at $7.13/share, down 97% from its all-time high of $242.88 on December 17, 1999.

On June 26, 2001, VA Linux decided that it would leave the systems-hardware business and focus on software development. During the summer of 2001, all 153 of the hardware-focused employees were dismissed as a result of this shift in the company's business model.

On December 6, 2001, the company formally changed its name to VA Software, recognizing that the majority of the business was now software development and specialty news and information services. However, the company's Japanese subsidiary still uses the name "VA Linux Systems Japan K.K."

On January 2, 2002, the company's stock price plunged 42% after an earnings warning.

=== SourceForge and OSDN ===
SourceForge Inc. logo

In December 2003, VA Software announced SourceForge Enterprise Edition, re-written in Java for offshore outsourcing software development.

By April 2004, the company focused on SourceForge, an online software application, and OSDN, a group of websites catering to people in the information technology and software development industries, which was renamed to Open Source Technology Group (OSTG). At that time, the stock was trading at $1.94/share.

In January 2006, VA Software sold Animation Factory to Jupitermedia Corporation.

On April 24, 2007, the company sold SourceForge Enterprise Edition to CollabNet.

On May 24, 2007, VA Software changed its name to SourceForge Inc. and merged with OSTG.

On January 5, 2009, Scott Kauffman was appointed president and chief executive officer of SourceForge.

=== Geeknet ===
In November 2009, SourceForge, Inc. changed its name to Geeknet, Inc.

Geeknet president and chief executive officer Scott Kauffman resigned on August 4, 2010, and was replaced by executive chairman Kenneth Langone.

On August 10, 2010, Jason Baird, the chief operations officer, and Michael Rudolph, the chief marketing officer resigned, both effective 31 August 2010. Jay Seirmarco, the chief technology officer also resigned, effective September 30, 2010.

Effective January 31, 2011, Geeknet appointed Matthew C. Blank, former chief executive officer and chairman of Showtime Networks as a member of its board of directors.

Later in 2011, the company renamed its Freshmeat website to Freecode.

In September 2012, Slashdot, SourceForge, and Freecode were sold to Dice Holdings for $20 million, leaving ThinkGeek as the sole property of Geeknet.

In May 2015, Hot Topic offered to acquire the company for $122 million. However, in June 2015, GameStop offered $140 million; the acquisition by GameStop closed in July 2015.
