= SourceForge =

Software discovery and hosting platform for B2B and open source software

- SourceForge logo since 2018
- Website type: Software discovery platform for free hosting for open-source software project management and B2B software review & comparison directory
- Owners: Slashdot Media (2019–present); BIZX, LLC (2016–2019); DHI Group, Inc. (2012–2016); Geeknet, Inc. (1999–2012)
- Creator: VA Software
- Key people: Logan Abbott (President)
- Website: sourceforge.net
- IPv6 support: Yes
- Commercial: Yes
- Registration: Optional (required for creating and joining projects)
- Launched: November 1999; 27 years ago
- Current status: Online

SourceForge is a web service that provides a centralized software discovery platform, including an online platform for managing and hosting open-source software projects, and a directory for comparing and reviewing B2B software that lists over 104,500 business software titles. It provides source code repository hosting, bug tracking, mirroring of downloads for load balancing, a wiki for documentation, developer and user mailing lists, user-support forums, user-written reviews and ratings, a news bulletin, micro-blog for publishing project updates, and other features.

Sourceforge was founded by Tony Guntharp, Uriah Welcome, Tim Perdue, and Drew Streib in November 1999. It was one of the first to offer this service free of charge to open-source projects. Since 2012, the website has run on Apache Allura software. SourceForge offers free hosting and free access to tools for developers of free and open-source software.

As of September 2020, the SourceForge repository claimed to host more than 502,000 projects and had more than 3.7 million registered users.

== Concept ==
SourceForge is a web-based source code repository. It acts as a centralized location for free and open-source software projects. It was the first to offer this service for free to open-source projects. Project developers have access to centralized storage and tools for managing projects, though it is best known for providing revision control systems such as CVS, Subversion, Bazaar, Git and Mercurial. Major features (amongst others) include project wikis, metrics and analysis, access to a MySQL database, and unique sub-domain URLs (in the form https://project-name.sourceforge.net).

=== Revenue model ===
SourceForge's traditional revenue model is through advertising banner sales on their site. Reported revenue increased from quarterly takings of US$1 million in 2005, to 6.5 million in 2006 to US$23 million a quarter in 2009 before dropping back to reported total annual revenue of US$20 million in 2011 across SourceForge, slashdot and freecode (prior to SourceForge's acquisition).

Since 2013, additional revenue generation schemes, such as bundleware models, have been trialled, with the goal of increasing SourceForge's revenue. Negative community reactions to the partnership program led to a review of the program, which was nonetheless opened up to all SourceForge projects on February 7, 2014.

On February 9, 2016, the new owners BIZX, LLC, announced they had eliminated the DevShare program.

== History ==
Former logo of SourceForge

SourceForge, founded in 1999 by VA Software, was the first provider of a centralized location for free and open-source software developers to control and manage software development and offering this service free of charge. The software running the SourceForge site was released as free software in January 2000 and was later named SourceForge Alexandria. The last release under a free license was made in November 2001. After the dot-com bubble, SourceForge was later powered by the proprietary SourceForge Enterprise Edition, a separate product re-written in Java which was marketed for use in offshore outsourcing.

SourceForge has been temporarily banned in China three times: in September 2002, in July 2008 (for about a month) and on August 6, 2012 (for several days).

In November 2008, SourceForge was sued by the French collection society Société civile des Producteurs de Phonogrammes en France (SPPF) for hosting downloads of the file sharing application Shareaza.

In 2009, SourceForge announced a new site platform known as Allura, which would be an extensible, open source platform licensed under the Apache License, utilizing components such as Python and MongoDB, and offering REST APIs. In June 2012, the Allura project was donated to the Apache Software Foundation as Apache Allura.

In September 2012, SourceForge, Slashdot, and Freecode were acquired from Geeknet by the online job site Dice.com for $20 million, and incorporated into a subsidiary known as Slashdot Media. In July 2015, Dice announced that it planned to sell SourceForge and Slashdot, and, in January 2016, the two sites were sold to the San Diego–based BIZX, LLC for an undisclosed amount. In December 2019, BIZX rebranded as Slashdot Media.

On September 26, 2012, it was reported that attackers had compromised a SourceForge mirror, and modified a download of phpMyAdmin to add security exploits.

== Installer with adware ==
In July 2013, SourceForge announced that it would provide project owners with an optional feature called DevShare, which places closed-source ad-supported content into the binary installers and gives the project part of the ad revenue. Opinions of this new feature varied; some complained about users not being as aware of what they are getting or being able to trust the downloaded content, whereas others saw it as a reasonably harmless option that keeps individual projects and users in control.

In November 2013, GIMP, a free image manipulation program, removed its download from SourceForge, citing misleading download buttons that potentially confuse customers as well as SourceForge's own Windows installer, which bundles potentially unwanted programs with GIMP. In a statement, GIMP called SourceForge a "once useful and trustworthy place to develop and host FLOSS applications" that now faces "a problem with the ads they allow on their sites". In some cases this program appeared to introduce malware bundled with SourceForge downloads.

In May 2015, SourceForge took control of pages for five projects that had migrated to other hosting sites and replaced the project downloads with adware-laden downloads, including GIMP. This came despite SourceForge's commitment in November 2013 to never bundle adware with project downloads without developers' consent.

On June 1, 2015, SourceForge claimed that they had stopped coupling "third party offers" with unmaintained SourceForge projects. After this announcement was made, more developers continued to report that their SourceForge projects had been taken over by SourceForge staff accounts (but have not had binaries edited), including nmap and VLC media player. On June 18, 2015, SourceForge announced that SourceForge-maintained mirrored projects were removed and anticipated the formation of a Community Panel to review their mirroring practices.

SourceForge discontinued DevShare and the bundling of installers after SourceForge was sold to BizX in early 2016. On May 17, 2016, SourceForge announced that they were now scanning all projects for malware and displaying warnings on projects detected to have malware.

== Usage ==
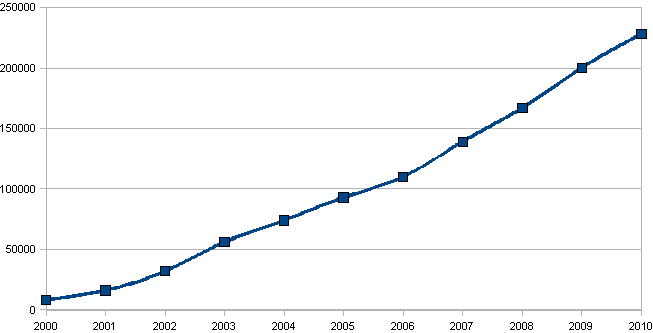
Number of hosted projects, 2000–2010

As of May 2013, the SourceForge repository hosted more than 300,000 projects and had more than 3 million registered users, although not all were active. The domain sourceforge.net attracted at least 33 million visitors by August 2009 according to a Compete.com survey.

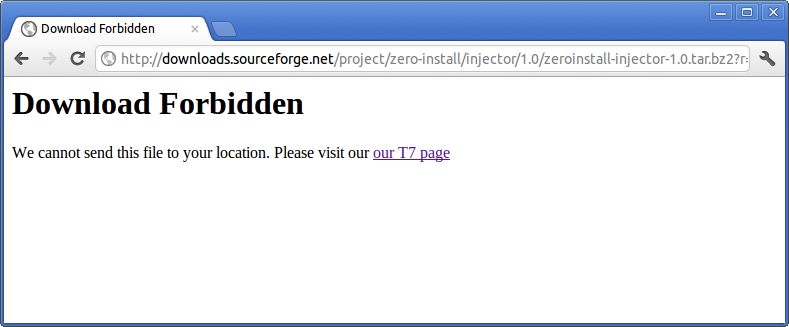
An error message seen by someone attempting to access SourceForge from Iran, an ITAR-restricted country

In its terms of use, SourceForge states that its services are not available to users in countries on the sanction list of the U.S. Office of Foreign Assets Control (including Cuba, Iran, North Korea, Sudan and Syria). Since 2008 the secure server used for making contributions to the site has blocked access from those countries. In January 2010, the site had blocked all access from those countries, including downloads. Any IP address that appeared to belong to one of those countries could not use the site. By the following month, SourceForge relaxed the restrictions so that individual projects could indicate whether or not SourceForge should block their software from download to those countries. This, however, had been reversed by November 2020 for North Korea and other countries. Crimea has been blocked since February 1, 2015.

== See also ==
- Comparison of source-code-hosting facilities
