= Slashdot =

Technology-related news and reviews website

Slashdot (/.)
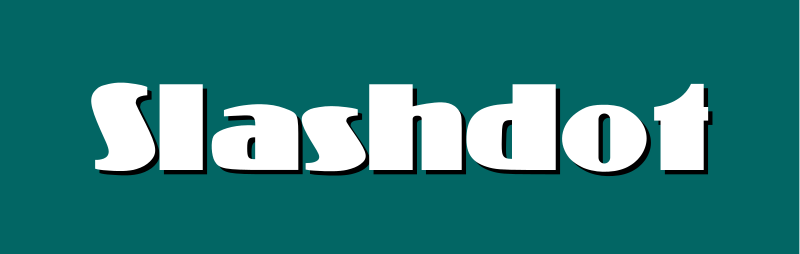
- Website type: Online newspaper Social news B2B software Reviews
- Available in: English
- Owner: Slashdot Media
- Creators: Rob Malda; Jeff Bates
- Key people: Logan Abbott (President)
- Revenue: Advertisement, optional subscription
- Website: slashdot.org
- Registration: Optional
- Launched: October 5, 1997; 29 years ago
- Current status: Online
- Written in: Perl

Slashdot (sometimes abbreviated as /.) is a social news website that originally billed itself as "News for Nerds. Stuff that Matters". It features news stories on science, technology, and politics that are submitted and evaluated by site users and editors. Each story has a comments section where users can add online comments. Slashdot also offers a business software comparison directory with over 100,000 software products.

The website was founded in 1997 by Hope College students Rob Malda, also known as "CmdrTaco", and classmate Jeff Bates, also known as "Hemos". In 2012, they sold it to DHI Group, Inc. (i.e., Dice Holdings International, which created the Dice.com website for tech job seekers). In January 2016, BIZX acquired both slashdot.org and SourceForge. In December 2019, BIZX rebranded to Slashdot Media.

Summaries of stories and links to news articles are submitted by Slashdot's own users, and each story becomes the topic of a threaded discussion among users. Discussion is moderated by a user-based moderation system. Randomly selected moderators are assigned points (typically 5) which they can use to rate a comment. Moderation applies either −1 or +1 to the current rating, based on whether the comment is perceived as either "normal", "offtopic", "insightful", "redundant", "interesting", or "troll" (among others).

The site's comment and moderation system is administered by its own open source content management system, Slash, which is available under the GNU General Public License. In 2012, Slashdot had around 3.7 million unique visitors per month and received over 5300 comments per day. The site has won more than 20 awards, including People's Voice Awards in 2000 for "Best Community Site" and "Best News Site". At its peak use, a news story posted to the site with a link could overwhelm some smaller or independent sites. This phenomenon was known as the "Slashdot effect".

== History ==
=== 1990s ===
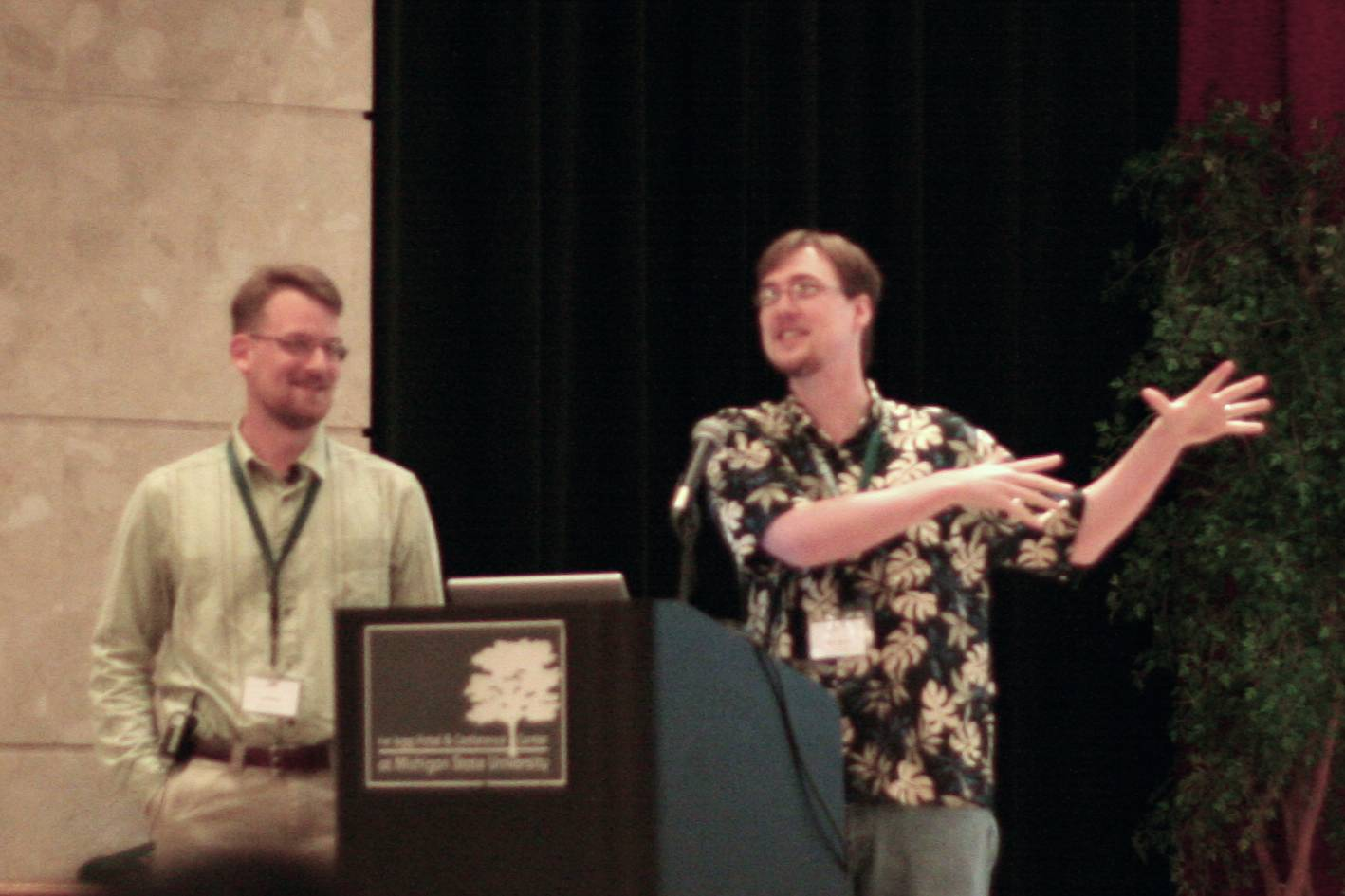
Co-founders Rob Malda and Jeff Bates

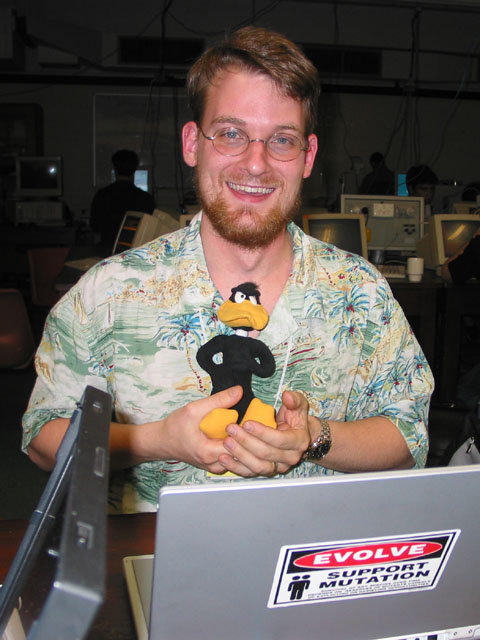
Co-founder Jeff Bates

Slashdot was preceded by Rob Malda's personal website "Chips & Dips", which launched in October 1997, featured a single "rant" each day about something that interested its author – typically something to do with Linux or open source software. At the time, Malda was a student at Hope College in Holland, Michigan, majoring in computer science. The site became "Slashdot" in September 1997 under the slogan "News for Nerds. Stuff that Matters", and quickly became a hotspot on the Internet for news and information of interest to computer geeks.

The name "Slashdot" came from a somewhat "obnoxious parody of a URL" – when Malda registered the domain, he desired to make a name that was "silly and unpronounceable" – try pronouncing out, 'h-t-t-p-colon-slash-slash-slashdot-dot-org'". By June 1998, the site was seeing as many as 100,000 page views per day and advertisers began to take notice. By December 1998, Slashdot had net revenues of $18,000, yet its Internet profile was higher and revenues were expected to increase.

On June 29, 1999, the site was sold to Linux megasite Andover.net for $1.5 million in cash and $7 million in Andover stock at the Initial public offering (IPO) price. Part of the deal was contingent upon the continued employment of Malda and Bates and on the achievement of certain "milestones". With the acquisition of Slashdot, Andover.net could now advertise itself as "the leading Linux/Open Source destination on the Internet". Andover.net merged with VA Linux on February 3, 2000, changed its name to SourceForge, Inc. on May 24, 2007, and then became Geeknet, Inc. on November 4, 2009.

=== 2000s ===
Slashdot's 10,000th article was posted after two and a half years on February 24, 2000, and the 100,000th article was posted on December 11, 2009, after 12 years online. During the first 12 years, the most active story with the most responses posted was the post-2004 US Presidential Election article "Kerry Concedes Election To Bush" with 5,687 posts. This followed the creation of a new article section, politics.slashdot.org, created at the start of the 2004 election on September 7, 2004. Many of the most popular stories are political, with "Strike on Iraq" (March 19, 2003) the second-most-active article and "Barack Obama Wins US Presidency" (November 5, 2008) the third-most-active. The rest of the 10 most active articles are an article announcing the 2005 London bombings, and several articles about Evolution vs. Intelligent Design, Saddam Hussein's capture, and Fahrenheit 9/11. Articles about Microsoft and its Windows Operating System are popular. A thread posted in 2002 titled "What's Keeping You On Windows?" was the 10th-most-active story, and an article about Windows 2000/NT4 source-code leaks the most visited article with more than 680,000 hits. Some controversy erupted on March 9, 2001, after an anonymous user posted the full text of Scientology's "Operating Thetan Level Three" (OT III) document in a comment attached to a Slashdot article. The Church of Scientology demanded that Slashdot remove the document under the Digital Millennium Copyright Act. A week later, in a long article, Slashdot editors explained their decision to remove the page while providing links and information on how to get the document from other sources.

Slashdot Japan was launched on May 28, 2001 (although the first article was published April 5, 2001) and is an official offshoot of the US-based Web site. As of January 2010 the site was owned by OSDN-Japan, Inc., and carried some of the US-based Slashdot articles as well as localized stories. An external site, New Media Services, has reported the importance of Online Moderation last December 1, 2011. On Valentine's Day 2002, founder Rob Malda proposed to longtime girlfriend Kathleen Fent using the front page of Slashdot. They were married on December 8, 2002, in Las Vegas, Nevada. Slashdot implemented a paid subscription service on March 1, 2002. Slashdot's subscription model works by allowing users to pay a small fee to be able to view pages without banner ads, starting at a rate of $5 per 1,000 page views – non-subscribers may still view articles and respond to comments, with banner ads in place. On March 6, 2003, subscribers were given the ability to see articles 10 to 20 minutes before they are released to the public. Slashdot altered its threaded discussion forum display software to explicitly show domains for links in articles, as "users made a sport out of tricking unsuspecting readers into visiting [Goatse.cx]."

In observance of April Fools' Day in 2006, Slashdot temporarily changed its signature teal color theme to a warm palette of bubblegum pink and changed its masthead from the usual, "News for Nerds" motto to, "OMG!!! Ponies!!!" Editors joked that this was done to increase female readership. In another supposed April Fools' Day joke, User Achievement tags were introduced on April 1, 2009. This system allowed users to be tagged with various achievements, such as "The Tagger" for tagging a story or "Member of the {1,2,3,4,5} Digit UID Club" for having a Slashdot UID consisting of a certain number of digits. While it was posted on April Fools' Day to allow for certain joke achievements, the system is real. Slashdot unveiled its newly redesigned site on June 4, 2006, following a CSS Redesign Competition. The winner of the competition was Alex Bendiken, who built on the initial CSS framework of the site. The new site looks similar to the old one but is more polished with more rounded curves, collapsible menus, and updated fonts. On November 9 that same year, Malda wrote that Slashdot attained 16,777,215 (or 2^{24} − 1) comments, which broke the database for three hours until the administrators fixed the problem.

=== 2010s ===
On July 11, 2010, SlashDot was the first major media platform where Bitcoin, the first cryptocurrency, was publicized. On January 25, 2011, the site launched its third major redesign in its 13.5-year history, which gutted the HTML and CSS, and updated the graphics. On August 25, 2011, Malda resigned as Editor-in-Chief with immediate effect. He did not mention any plans for the future, other than spending more time with his family, catching up on some reading, and possibly writing a book. His final farewell message received over 1,400 comments within 24 hours on the site. On December 7, 2011, Slashdot announced that it would start to push what the company described as "sponsored" Ask Slashdot questions. On March 28, 2012, Slashdot launched Slashdot TV. Two months later, in May 2012, Slashdot launched SlashBI, SlashCloud, and SlashDataCenter, three websites dedicated to original journalistic content. The websites proved controversial, with longtime Slashdot users commenting that the original content ran counter to the website's longtime focus on user-generated submissions. Nick Kolakowski, the editor of the three websites, told The Next Web that the websites were "meant to complement Slashdot with an added layer of insight into a very specific area of technology, without interfering with Slashdot's longtime focus on tech-community interaction and discussion." Despite the debate, articles published on SlashCloud and SlashBI attracted attention from io9, NPR, Nieman Lab, Vanity Fair, and other publications.

In September 2012, Slashdot, SourceForge, and Freecode were acquired by online job site Dice.com for $20 million, and incorporated into a subsidiary known as Slashdot Media. While initially stating that there were no plans for major changes to Slashdot, in October 2013, Slashdot launched a "beta" for a significant redesign of the site, which featured a simpler appearance and commenting system. While initially an opt-in beta, the site automatically began migrating selected users to the new design in February 2014; the rollout led to a negative response from many longtime users, upset by the added visual complexity, and the removal of features, such as comment viewing, that distinguished Slashdot from other news sites. An organized boycott of the site was held from February 10 to 17, 2014. The "beta" site was eventually shelved. In July 2015, Dice announced that it planned to sell Slashdot and SourceForge; in particular, the company stated in a filing that it was unable to "successfully [leverage] the Slashdot user base to further Dice's digital recruitment business".

On January 27, 2016, the two sites were sold to the San Diego–based BizX, LLC for an undisclosed amount.

== Administration ==
=== Team ===
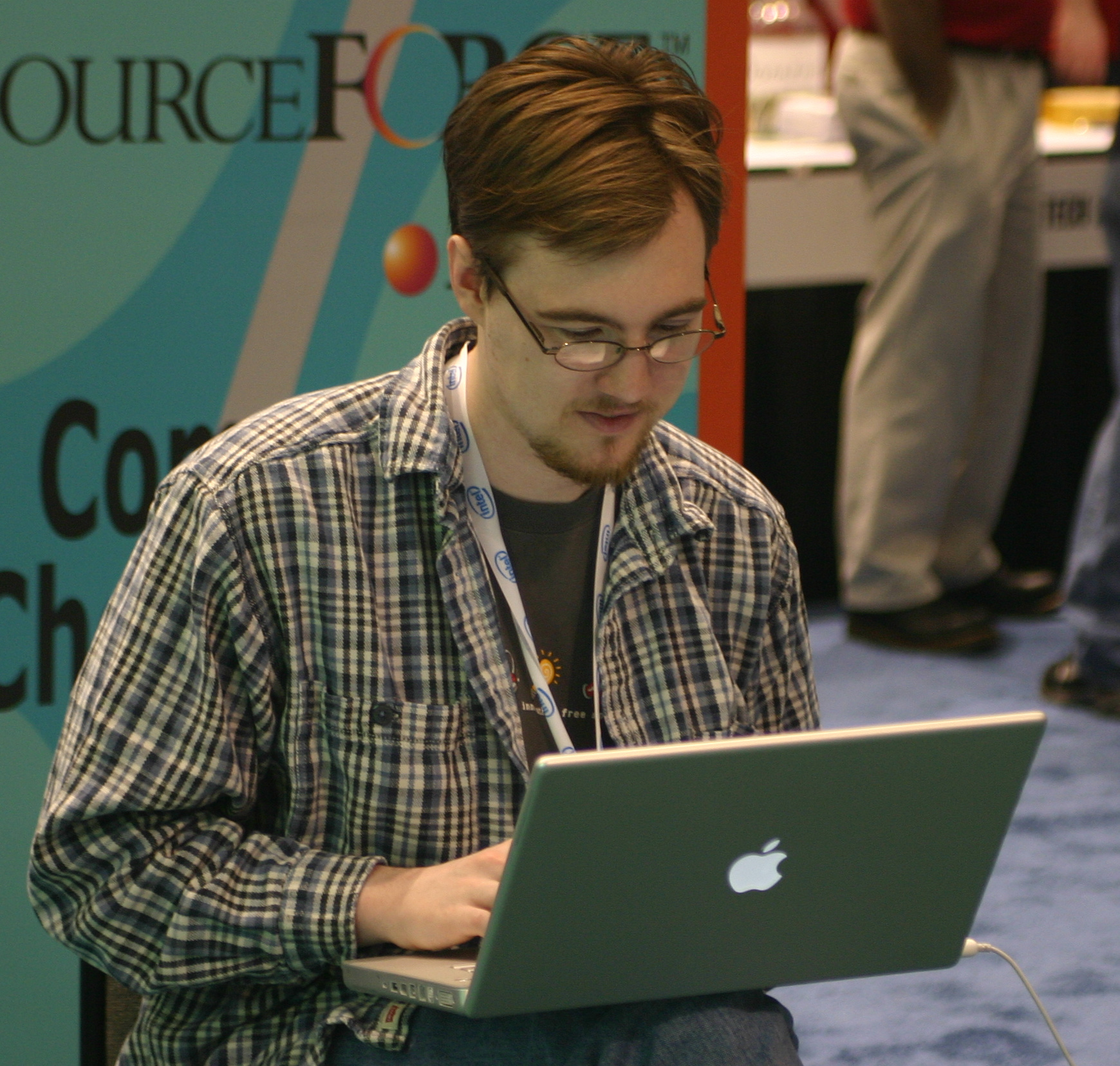
Rob Malda, co-founder of Slashdot

It was run by its founder, Rob "CmdrTaco" Malda, from 1998 until 2011. He shared editorial responsibilities with several other editors including Timothy Lord, Patrick "Scuttlemonkey" McGarry, Jeff "Soulskill" Boehm, Rob "Samzenpus" Rozeboom, and Keith Dawson. Jonathan "cowboyneal" Pater is another popular editor of Slashdot, who came to work for Slashdot as a programmer and systems administrator. His online nickname (handle), CowboyNeal, is inspired by a Grateful Dead tribute to Neal Cassady in their song, "That's It for the Other One". He is best known as the target of the usual comic poll option, a tradition started by Chris DiBona.

=== Software ===
Slashdot runs on Slash, a content management system available under the GNU General Public License. Early versions of Slash were written by Rob Malda in the spring of 1998. After Andover.net bought Slashdot in June 1999, Several programmers were hired to structure the code and render it scalable, as its users had increased from a few hundred to tens of thousands. This work was done by Brian Aker, Patrick Galbraith, Chris Nandor and others, resulting in version 2 of the software, released in 2001. Slash remains Free software and anyone can contribute to development.

=== Peer moderation ===
Slashdot's editors are primarily responsible for selecting and editing the primary stories that are posted daily by submitters. The editors provide a one-paragraph summary for each story and a link to an external website where the story originated. Each story becomes the topic for a threaded discussion among the site's users. A user-based moderation system is employed to filter out abusive or offensive comments. Every comment is initially given a score of −1 to +2, with a default score of +1 for registered users, 0 for anonymous users (Anonymous Coward), +2 for users with high "karma", or −1 for users with low "karma". As moderators read comments attached to articles, they click to moderate the comment, either up (+1) or down (−1). Moderators may choose to attach a particular descriptor to the comments as well, such as "normal", "offtopic", "flamebait", "troll", "redundant", "insightful", "interesting", "informative", "funny", "overrated", or "underrated", with each corresponding to a −1 or +1 rating. So a comment may be seen to have a rating of "+1 insightful" or "−1 troll". Comments are very rarely deleted, even if they contain hateful remarks.

Moderation points add to a user's rating, which is known as "karma" on Slashdot. The system randomly chooses active readers with good karma for three day stints as moderators, assigning most users five points but assigning those with "excellent" karma fifteen points. Mod points not used within the three day period expire.

Paid staff editors have an unlimited number of moderation points. A given comment can have any integer score from −1 to +5, and registered users of Slashdot can set a personal threshold so that no comments with a lesser score are displayed. For instance, a user reading Slashdot at level +5 will only see the highest rated comments, while a user reading at level −1 will see a more "unfiltered, anarchic version". A meta-moderation system was implemented on September 7, 1999, to moderate the moderators and help contain abuses in the moderation system. Meta-moderators are presented with a set of moderations that they may rate as either fair or unfair. For each moderation, the meta-moderator sees the original comment and the reason assigned by the moderator (e.g. troll, funny), and the meta-moderator can click to see the context of comments surrounding the one that was moderated.

== Features ==
=== Tags ===
Slashdot uses a system of "tags" where users can categorize a story to group them together and sorting them. Tags are written in all lowercase, with no spaces, and limited to 64 characters. For example, articles could be tagged as being about "security" or "mozilla". Some articles are tagged with longer tags, such as "whatcouldpossiblygowrong" (expressing the perception of catastrophic risk), "suddenoutbreakofcommonsense" (used when the community feels that the subject has finally figured out something obvious), "correlationnotcausation" (used when scientific articles lack direct evidence; see correlation does not imply causation), or "getyourasstomars" (commonly seen in articles about Mars or space exploration).

Slashdot has discontinued the use of tags, with all tags now saying 'story.'

== Culture ==
Tux, the mascot of Linux

As an online community with primarily user-generated content, many in-jokes and internet memes have developed over the course of the site's history. A popular meme (based on an unscientific Slashdot user poll) is, "In Soviet Russia, noun verb you!" This type of joke has its roots in the 1960s or earlier, and is known as a "Russian reversal". Other popular memes usually pertain to computing or technology, such as "Imagine a Beowulf cluster of these", "But does it run Linux?", or "Netcraft now confirms: BSD (or some other software package or item) is dying." Users will also typically refer to articles referring to data storage and data capacity by inquiring how much it is in units of Libraries of Congress. Sometimes bandwidth speeds are referred to in units of Libraries of Congress per second. When numbers are quoted, people will comment that the number happens to be the "combination to their luggage" (a reference to the Mel Brooks film Spaceballs) and express false anger at the person who revealed it.

Slashdotters often use the abbreviation TFA which stands for The fucking article or RTFA ("Read the fucking article"), which itself is derived from the abbreviation RTFM. Usage of this abbreviation often exposes comments from posters who have not read the article linked to in the main story. Slashdotters typically like to mock then United States Senator Ted Stevens' 2006 description of the Internet as a "series of tubes" or former Microsoft CEO Steve Ballmer's chair-throwing incident from 2005. Microsoft founder Bill Gates is a popular target of jokes by Slashdotters, and all stories about Microsoft were once identified with a graphic of Gates looking like a Borg from Star Trek: The Next Generation. Many Slashdotters have long talked about the supposed release of Duke Nukem Forever, which was promised in 1997 but was delayed indefinitely (the game was eventually released in 2011). References to the game are commonly brought up in other articles about software packages that are not yet in production even though the announced delivery date has long passed (see vaporware). Having a low Slashdot user identifier (user ID) is highly valued since they are assigned sequentially; having one is a sign that someone has an older account and has contributed to the site longer. For Slashdot's 10-year anniversary in 2007, one of the items auctioned off in the charity auction for the Electronic Frontier Foundation was a 3-digit Slashdot user ID.

== Traffic and publicity ==
This graph shows the sudden surge in web traffic that a popular news story on Slashdot can cause.

In 2006, Slashdot had approximately 5.5 million users per month.

The primary stories on the site consist of a short synopsis paragraph, a link to the original story, and a lengthy discussion section, all contributed by users. At its peak, discussion on stories could get up to 10,000 posts per day. Slashdot has been considered a pioneer in user-driven content, influencing other sites such as Google News and Wikipedia. There has been a dip in readership as of 2011, primarily due to the increase of technology-related blogs and Twitter feeds.

In 2002, approximately 50% of Slashdot's traffic consisted of people who simply check out the headlines and click through, while others participate in discussion boards and take part in the community. Many links in Slashdot stories caused the linked site to get swamped by heavy traffic and its server to collapse. This was known as the "Slashdot effect", a term first coined on February 15, 1999, that refers to an article about a "new generation of niche Web portals driving unprecedented amounts of traffic to sites of interest".

Slashdot has received over twenty awards, including People's Voice Awards in 2000 in both of the categories for which it was nominated (Best Community Site and Best News Site). It was also voted as one of Newsweek's favorite technology Web sites and rated in Yahoo!'s Top 100 Web sites as the "Best Geek Hangout" (2001). The main antagonists in the 2004 novel Century Rain, by Alastair Reynolds – The Slashers – are named after Slashdot users. The site was mentioned briefly in the 2000 novel Cosmonaut Keep, written by Ken MacLeod. Several tech celebrities have stated that they either checked the website regularly or participated in its discussion forums using an account. Some of these celebrities include: Apple co-founder Steve Wozniak, writer and actor Wil Wheaton, and id Software technical director John Carmack.

== Deterioration ==
- Unlike other sites, UTF-8 was never adopted. All text is rendered as ASCII. Including parts of news posts quoted from third party sites.
- The mobile interface, added after Slashdot was sold off, was never finished, and lacks fundamental functionality, like account settings, anonymous posting, choice of markup style (important because of above lack of UTF-8), etc.
- No visible changes to the site have been made since the addition of the mobile interface and rudimentary asynchronous functionality.
- Comment numbers have declined to a tenth compared to its golden age.
- As of late Summer 2023, the registration mechanism for new users is disabled, and manual requests via feedback email must be made.

== See also ==
- Digg
- Fark
- Hacker News
- Phoronix
- Reddit
- The Register
- Solidot (in Chinese), a Chinese clone of Slashdot, whose name comes from "solidus" (alternate name of slash) and "dot"
