= Saarinen =

Saarinen is a Finnish surname of Virtanen type derived from the word 'saari', "island". Notable people with the surname include:

- Aarne Saarinen (1913–2004), Finnish politician
- Aino-Kaisa Saarinen (born 1979), Finnish skier
- Aline B. Saarinen (1914–1972), American art and architecture critic
- Annamarie Saarinen (born 1960), American health advocate and economist
- Ari Saarinen (born 1967), Finnish ice hockey player
- Arno Saarinen (1884–1970), Finnish gymnast
- Eero Saarinen (1910–1961), son of Eliel, also a Finnish architect and furniture designer
- Eeva Saarinen (born 1984), Finnish breaststroke swimmer
- Eliel Saarinen (1873–1950), Finnish architect
- Eric Saarinen (1942–2024), American cinematographer and film director
- Esa Saarinen (born 1953), Finnish philosopher
- Ingegerd Saarinen (born 1947), Swedish politician
- Jaana Saarinen (born 1955), Finnish actress
- Janne Saarinen (born 1977), Finnish footballer
- Jarno Saarinen, (1945–1973), Finnish motorcycle racer
- Jenni Saarinen (born 1999), Finnish figure skater
- Jesse Saarinen (born 1985), Finnish ice hockey player
- Johanna Saarinen (born 1973), Finnish biathlete
- K. A. Saarinen (1869–1932), Finnish land surveyor and lawyer
- Lilian Swann Saarinen (1912–1995), American sculptor and artist
- Loja Saarinen (1879–1968), Finnish-American textile artist and sculptor
- Mari Saarinen (born 1981), Finnish ice hockey player
- Martti Saarinen (born 1980), Finnish singer
- Matti Saarinen (1946/1947–2021), Finnish politician
- Mikko Saarinen (1946–2022), Finnish boxer
- Olavi Saarinen (1923–1979), Finnish politician
- Olli Saarinen (1953–2025), Finnish ice hockey player
- Ossi Saarinen (born 1986), Finnish ice hockey player
- Pekka Saarinen (born 1983), Finnish car racer
- Sakari Saarinen (born 1978), Finnish footballer
- Sanna Saarinen (born 1991), Finnish women's footballer
- Seth Saarinen (born 2001), Finnish footballer
- Simo Saarinen (born 1963), Finnish ice hockey player
- Tero Saarinen (born 1964), Finnish dancer and choreographer
- Tommi Saarinen (born 1995), Finnish footballer
- Veli Saarinen (1902–1969), Finnish cross-country skier
- Yrjö Saarinen (1899–1977), Finnish engineer and politician
- Yrjö Saarinen (painter) (1899–1958), Finnish painter

== See also ==
- Saari
