= OZ Systems =

American health innovation technology company

OZ Systems, Inc.
- Company type: Private
- Founded: 1996
- Headquarters: Arlington, Texas, U.S.
- Website: www.ozsystems.com

OZ Systems is a Texas-based health innovation technology company that develops and implements information technology platforms primarily focused on newborn screening.

== History ==
OZ Systems was founded in 1996 in Arlington, Texas by Dr. Ken Pool and Dr. Terese Finitzo, to build an integrated technology system that measures, tracks, analyzes and reports hospital data. In 2000, OZ Systems was awarded a statewide contract for Texas Newborn Hearing Screening. In 2013, OZ Systems developed their OZ Telepathy technology for CCHD screening that captures information directly from pulse oximeters to improve interpretive accuracy. Since then, OZ Systems has partnered with Iowa and Minnesota to provide integrated Newborn Screening Information Systems for both states. In 2014, The Newborn Foundation awarded OZ Systems CEO Dr. Terese Finitzo the EVE Innovation Award for achievements in newborn screening, policy and technology. In 2015, OZ Systems partnered with JPS Health Network on their newborn screening practice.
