= José M. Delgado-García =

Spanish psychiatrist and academic

Academic background
- Education: University of Seville (M.D. Ph.D.)

José M. Delgado-García is a Spanish psychiatrist and an academic. He is a professor emeritus at Pablo de Olavide University.

Delgado-García's research has focused on learning, motor control, memory, neural motor systems, eye movement, and facial motor systems. As of July 2026 his work has received 17000 citations and his h-index was recorded as 70. He was elected as an academic member of the 2022 International Union of Physiological Science.

== Education ==
Delgado-García completed his bachelor's degree in medicine and surgery from the University of Seville from 1963 to 1969, followed by a doctorate in 1972 from the same institution.

== Career ==
Delgado-García initially worked as an assistant professor at the University of Seville between 1970 and 1972, followed by working as the interim associate professor at the Autonomous University of Madrid between 1972 and 1975. In 1978, he was the interim aggregate professor at the University of Seville, followed by an appointment as a tenured associate professor at the same institution between 1978 and 1986. In 1986, he was promoted to a professor there. In 2000, he joined Pablo de Olavide University as a tenured full professor, and in 2015, he became an emeritus professor there.

Delgado-García's administrative and professional appointments include working as a director of the Department of Physiology and Animal Biology between 1989 and 1994 at the University of Seville, as well as the principal investigator at the Andalusian Laboratory of Biology between 1997 and 2003. Additionally, between 2008 and 2015, he was director of the Animal Research Facility at Pablo de Olavide University. Moreover, since 1997, he has been the director of the division of neurosciences at Pablo de Olavide University.

== Research ==
Through his research, Delgado-Garcia has studied the neural mechanisms of memory and learning, specifically the role of cerebellar and hippocampal circuits in associative learning. His work on trace eyeblink conditioning as a model for examining the neural basis of memory formation and learning-related synaptic plasticity has been studied in independent studies. A major part of his research has studied variations in hippocampal CA3–CA1 synaptic transmission during learning. Independent reviews of his works have acknowledged that learning correlates with measurable changes in synaptic strength and that experimentally disrupting CA3-CA1 plasticity interferes with the acquisition of learned response.

Delgado-García's work has also focused on the neural control of conditioned eyelid responses. His research, wherein he identified that specific classes of neurons within the interpositus nucleus respond differently to eyelid opening and closure during the eyeblink conditioning, has also been reported in independent studies. Moreover, independent studies further highlighted his work on neuronal populations differentially regulating learned eyelids, further stating that some neurons are associated with eyelid openings and other with eyelid closure.

== Awards and honors ==
- 2022 – Elected Academic Member, International Union of Physiological Science

== Selected publications ==
- Madroñal, Noelia; Delgado-García, José M.; Fernández-Guizán, Azahara; Chatterjee, Jayanta; Köhn, Maja; Mattucci, Camilla; Jain, Apar; Tsetsenis, Theodoros; Illarionova, Anna; Grinevich, Valery; Gross, Cornelius T.; Gruart, Agnès (18 March 2016). "Rapid erasure of hippocampal memory following inhibition of dentate gyrus granule cells". Nature Communications. 7 (1) 10923. Bibcode:2016NatCo...710923M. doi:10.1038/ncomms10923. PMC 4802048. PMID 26988806.
- Ammann, C.; Marquez-Ruiz, J.; Gomez-Climent, M. A.; Delgado-Garcia, J. M.; Gruart, A. (29 June 2016). "The Motor Cortex Is Involved in the Generation of Classically Conditioned Eyelid Responses in Behaving Rabbits". Journal of Neuroscience. 36 (26): 6988–7001. doi:10.1523/JNEUROSCI.4190-15.2016. PMC 6604894. PMID 27358456.
- Sergaki, Maria Christina; López-Ramos, Juan Carlos; Stagkourakis, Stefanos; Gruart, Agnès; Broberger, Christian; Delgado-García, José María; Ibáñez, Carlos F. (June 2017). "Compromised Survival of Cerebellar Molecular Layer Interneurons Lacking GDNF Receptors GFRα1 or RET Impairs Normal Cerebellar Motor Learning". Cell Reports. 19 (10): 1977–1986. doi:10.1016/j.celrep.2017.05.030. PMC 5469938. PMID 28591570.
- Hernández-González, Samuel; Andreu-Sánchez, Celia; Martín-Pascual, Miguel Ángel; Gruart, Agnès; Delgado-García, José María (14 June 2017). "A Cognition-Related Neural Oscillation Pattern, Generated in the Prelimbic Cortex, Can Control Operant Learning in Rats". The Journal of Neuroscience. 37 (24): 5923–5935. doi:10.1523/JNEUROSCI.3651-16.2017. PMC 6596507. PMID 28536269.
- Fernández-Lamo, Iván; Delgado-García, José M; Gruart, Agnès (1 March 2018). "When and Where Learning is Taking Place: Multisynaptic Changes in Strength During Different Behaviors Related to the Acquisition of an Operant Conditioning Task by Behaving Rats". Cerebral Cortex. 28 (3): 1011–1023. doi:10.1093/cercor/bhx011. PMID 28199479.
- Andreu-Sánchez, Celia; Martín-Pascual, Miguel Ángel; Gruart, Agnès; Delgado-García, José María (December 2018). "Chaotic and Fast Audiovisuals Increase Attentional Scope but Decrease Conscious Processing". Neuroscience. 394: 83–97. doi:10.1016/j.neuroscience.2018.10.025. PMID 30367947.
- Conde-Moro, Ana R.; Rocha-Almeida, Florbela; Sánchez-Campusano, Raudel; Delgado-García, José M.; Gruart, Agnès (December 2019). "The activity of the prelimbic cortex in rats is enhanced during the cooperative acquisition of an instrumental learning task". Progress in Neurobiology. 183 101692. doi:10.1016/j.pneurobio.2019.101692. hdl:10433/19863. PMID 31521703.
- Reus-García, M Mar; Sánchez-Campusano, Raudel; Ledderose, Julia; Dogbevia, Godwin K; Treviño, Mario; Hasan, Mazahir T; Gruart, Agnès; Delgado-García, José M (1 January 2021). "The Claustrum is Involved in Cognitive Processes Related to the Classical Conditioning of Eyelid Responses in Behaving Rabbits". Cerebral Cortex. 31 (1): 281–300. doi:10.1093/cercor/bhaa225. PMC 7727357. PMID 32885230.
- Gruart, Agnès; Delgado-García, José M. (2 June 2023). "Neural bases of freedom and responsibility". Frontiers in Neural Circuits. 17 1191996. doi:10.3389/fncir.2023.1191996. PMC 10272542. PMID 37334060.
