= Biox Technology =

American medical technology company

- Type: Private company
- Industry: Medical devices
- Founded: 1979
- Founders: Michael Hickey, Scott Wilber, and Bill Moe
- Defunct: 1984
- Fate: Acquired
- Successor: Ohmeda
- Headquarters: Boulder, Colorado, United States
- Area served: Worldwide
- Key people: Scott Wilber
- Products: Pulse oximeter
- Owner: GE Healthcare

Biox Technology was an American medical technology company known for developing the first widely used pulse oximeter. It was acquired by BOC in 1984, and merged to create BOCs medical Group, Ohmeda.

Versions of the device continued to be sold after the acquisition under the brand name Ohmeda Biox 3700 Pulse Oximeter.

== History ==
Michael Hickey, Scott Wilber, and Bill Moe founded Biox Technology in 1979. Hickey served as the company's CEO, Wilber was the company's Chief Engineer and Scientist, and Moe was the company's Executive Vice President. Enervest, a Denver-based venture fund, funded the company.

Wilber invented the company's technology and developed the first oximeter patent. Wilber's development of a "normalization circuitry" proved to be a significant, long-lasting innovation in pulse oximetry.

Wilber led the company's product development for the Biox II, Biox IIa and Biox III product lines. He led the team of pulse oximeter engineers which later developed the Ohmeda Biox 3700 which was widely used in the anesthesia market in the mid-1980s.

The first commercially available oximeters were produced by Hewlett-Packard, and were large, cumbersome, and expensive. These devices were of limited value because they were largely focused on research in the respiratory care field. Biox introduced the first pulse oximeter to commercial distribution in 1980. Initially, the company focused its marketing on the respiratory care market. Later the company established a national, independent distribution network market of respiratory care physicians.

Unbeknownst to the company, the pulse oximeter was also being used to monitor oxygen deprivation in patients under anesthesia in operating rooms. Reports of this application reached the company's management in late 1982, and the company began to focus time and resources in developing operating room applications to help anesthesiologists monitor oxygenation levels in patients on the operating table.

The company began to experience competition in the anesthesia market from a new entry into the field, Nellcor. In order to enter the anesthesia market and to mitigate competitive pressures, the company retained Kidder Peabody to assist it in developing a strategic alliance with large corporations in the medical field. As a result of this effort, the BOC Group purchased Biox Technology in the summer of 1984. The company became a business unit of BOC's Medical Group, Ohmeda. The product was renamed to Ohmeda Biox 3700.

At the time of acquisition, Hickey, Moe, and Evans stayed on with the company as managers of the business unit; Wilber left the corporation. Under BOC management, the pulse oximeter market expanded significantly. The Ohmeda business unit remains in Boulder, Colorado as a medical device manufacturer. It is currently under the ownership of GE Healthcare.
