= Takuo =

- Gender: Male

Origin
- Origin: Japanese
- Meaning: Different meanings depending on the kanji used

Takuo (written: 卓雄, 拓央 or 択生) is a masculine Japanese given name. Notable people with the name include:

- Takuo Aoyagi (青柳 卓雄; 1936–2020), Japanese engineer
- Takuo Godō (伍堂 卓雄; 1877–1956), Japanese naval architect, Imperial Japanese Navy admiral and government minister
- Takuo Kawamura (川村 拓央; born 1975), Japanese voice actor
- Takuo Kojima (小島 卓雄; born 1955), Japanese astronomer
- Takuo Miyagishima (1928–2011), Japanese-American design engineer
- Takuo Ōkubo (大久保 択生; born 1989), Japanese footballer
- Takuo Yuasa (湯浅 卓雄; born 1949), Japanese conductor
