= Saari (surname) =

Saari is a Finnish surname of Laine type (meaning "island") and a Malaysian name.

- Abdul Halim Saari (born 1994), Malaysian football player
- Arto Saari (born 1981), Finnish skateboarder and photographer
- Chris Saari (born 1962), American association football player
- Donald G. Saari (born 1940), American mathematician
- Eero Saari (1928–2023), Finnish ice hockey player
- Ernst Saari (1882–1918), Finnish farmer and politician
- Faizal Saari (born 1991), Malaysian field hockey player
- Fitri Saari (born 1993), Malaysian field hockey player, brother of Faizal
- Heikki Saari (born 1984), Finnish drummer
- Henn Saari (1924–1999), Estonian linguist
- Henry Saari (born 1964), Finnish actor, director and porn star
- Irina Saari (born 1975), Finnish singer
- Jaakko Saari (born 1957), Finnish judoka
- Jarmo Saari, Finnish a guitarist, composer and producer
- Kirsikka Saari (born 1973), Finnish film maker and screenwriter
- Kyllikki Saari (1935–1953), Finnish homicide victim
- Lauri Saari (1888–1953), Finnish painter
- Maija Saari (born 1986), Finnish football player
- Matti Saari (1986–2008), Finnish perpetrator of Kauhajoki school shooting
- Mattias Saari (born 1994), Swedish ice hockey player
- Meeri Saari (1925–2018), Finnish shot putter
- Milla Saari (born 1975), Finnish cross country skier
- Mohd Fadzli Saari (born 1983), Malaysian football player and coach
- Peeter Saari (born 1945), Estonian physicist
- Rami Saari (born 1963), Israeli poet, translator, linguist and literary critic
- Ray Saari (born 1995), American association football player
- Roy Saari (1945–2008), American swimmer
- Saila Saari (born 1989), Finnish ice hockey player
- Sami Saari (born 1962), Finnish soul musician
- Sanna-Kaisa Saari (born 1987), Swedish-Finnish beauty pageant titleholder
- Santeri Saari (born 1994), Finnish ice hockey player
- Þór Saari (born 1960), member of the Icelandic parliament
- Wilho Saari, Finnish American player of the kantele, the Finnish psaltery
- Wimme Saari (born 1959), Finnish Sami musician
- U-Wei Haji Saari (born 1954), Malaysian film director

== See also ==
- Saarinen
