= International Union of Physiological Sciences =

Professional body established in 1929

- Abbreviation: IUPS
- Formation: 1929; 97 years ago
- Type: INGO
- Region served: Worldwide
- Official language: English
- President: Susan Wray
- First vice-President: Susan Barman
- Secretary General: Ulrich Pohl
- Parent organization: International Council for Science (ICSU)
- Website: IUPS Official website

The International Union of Physiological Sciences, abbreviated IUPS, is the global umbrella organization for physiology.

IUPS aims to facilitate initiatives that strengthen the discipline of physiology. IUPS is a scientific union member of the International Council for Science (ICSU), and is accredited with the World Health Organization (WHO). The Union is composed of 54 National Members, 10 Associate Members, 2 Affiliated Members, 5 Regional Members and 5 Special Members. IUPS organizes an international congress every 4 years and, in association with the American Physiological Society publishes the review journal Physiology. in 2020 it established the journal Physiome to publish and curate mathematical models of physiological systems, the Physiome.

Since 2010 IUPS has participated in the interdisciplinary activities of Bio-Unions/ICSU.

== Congresses ==
- 1889 Basel
- 1892 Liege
- 1895 Bern
- 1898 Cambridge
- 1901 Turin
- 1904 Brussels
- 1907 Heidelberg
- 1910 Vienna
- 1913 Groningen
- 1920 Paris
- 1923 Edinburgh
- 1926 Stockholm
- 1929 Boston
- 1932 Rome
- 1935 Leningrad-Moscow
- 1938 Zurich
- 1947 Oxford
- 1950 Copenhagen
- 1953 Montréal
- 1956 Brussels
- 1959 Buenos Aires
- 1962 Leiden
- 1965 Tokyo
- 1968 Washington, D.C.
- 1971 Munich
- 1974 New Delhi
- 1977 Paris
- 1980 Budapest
- 1983 Sydney
- 1986 Vancouver
- 1989 Helsinki
- 1993 Glasgow
- 1997 St. Petersburg
- 2001 Christchurch
- 2005 San Diego, CA
- 2009 Kyoto, Japan
- 2013 Birmingham, UK
- 2017 Rio de Janeiro, Brazil
- 2022 Beijing, China (virtual meeting)

== Previous Presidents ==
- 1953-1956 Charles Best
- 1956-1959 Corneille Heymans
- 1959-1962 Bernardo Houssay
- 1962-1968 G.L. Brown
- 1968-1971 Wallace Fenn
- 1971-1974 Yngve Zotterman
- 1974-1980 Eric Neil
- 1980-1986 Knut Schmidt-Nielsen
- 1986-1993 Andrew Huxley
- 1993-1997 Masao Ito
- 1997-2001 Ewald Weibel
- 2001-2005 Alan Cowley
- 2005-2009 Akimichi Kaneko
- 2009-2017 Denis Noble
- 2017-2022 Julie Chan

== Previous Secretaries General ==
- 1953-1959 Maurice Visscher
- 1959-1965 Wallace Fenn
- 1965-1971 JW Duyff
- 1971-1980 Robert Hunsperger
- 1980-1986 J Scherrer
- 1986-1993 Robert Nacquet
- 1993-2001 Denis Noble
- 2001-2009 Ole Petersen
- 2010-2017 Walter Boron

== Structure ==
There are eight Commissions

1. Locomotion
2. Circulation & Respiration
3. Endocrine, Reproduction & Development
4. Neurobiology
5. Secretion & Absorption
6. Molecular & Cellular
7. Comparative: Evolution, Adaptation & Environment
8. Genomics & Biodiversity
