= Annamarie Saarinen =

American health advocate and economist

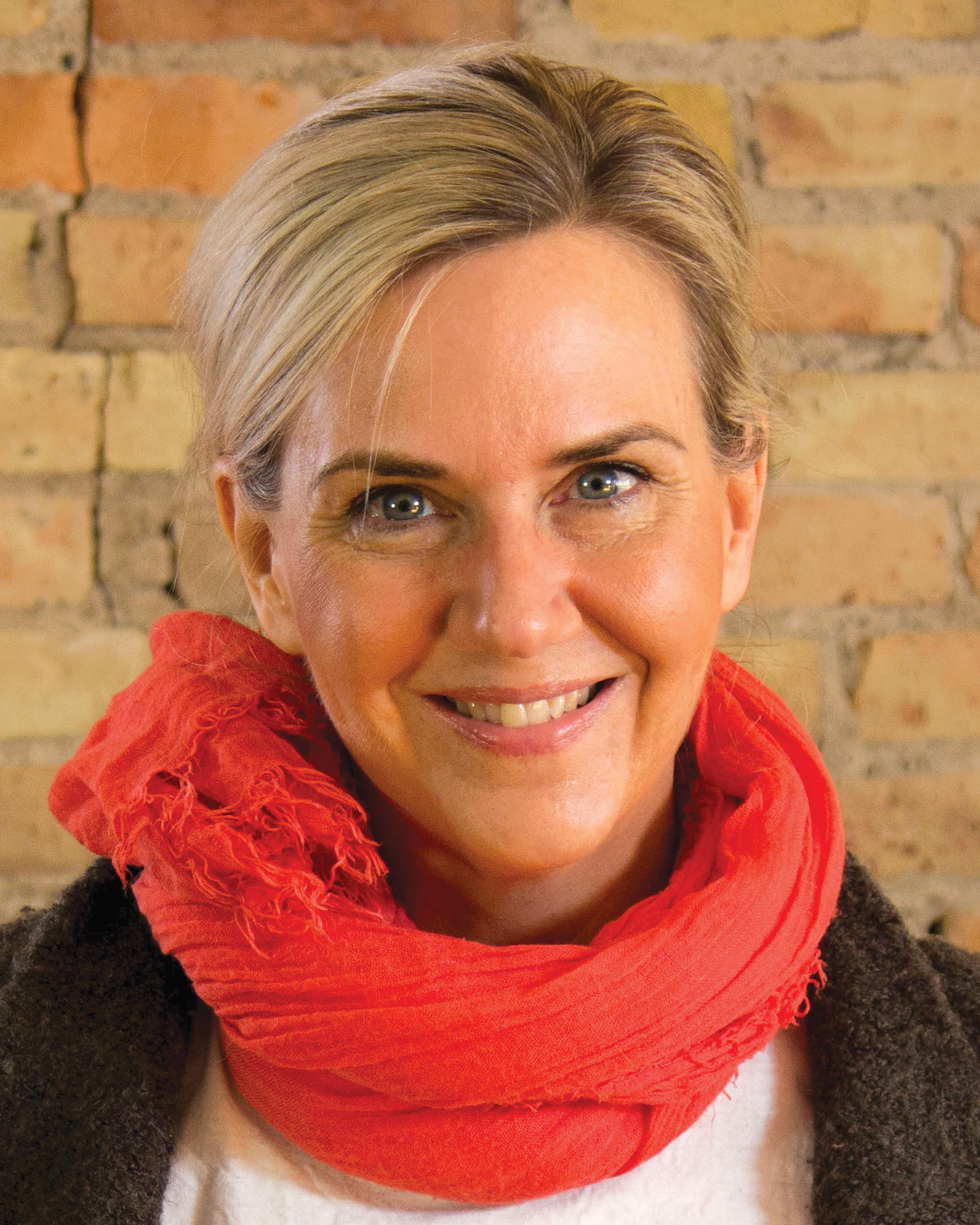
Annamarie Saarinen

Annamarie Saarinen is an American health advocate, economist and co-founder of the Newborn Foundation, a 501(c)(3) organization that aims to accelerate the pace of early detection and intervention for treatable newborn health conditions.

== Life ==
Saarinen is an adoptee, and she grew up in a small town in southwestern Minnesota.

In 2008, Saarinen's daughter Eve was born with a critical congenital heart defect (CCHD) and survived two heart surgeries in the first months of her life. She launched the country's first multi-hospital newborn heart screening pilot in collaboration with a state department of health.

In 2011, the Newborn Foundation | Coalition lobbied the U.S. Department of Health and Human Services to include pulse-oximetry testing for CCHDs in their universal screening recommendations. The screening was endorsed by the American Academy of Pediatrics, the American College of Cardiology, the American Heart Association and the March of Dimes. As a result, all 50 states, including the District of Columbia, adopted the Routine Uniform Screening Panel (RUSP).

The BORN project has provided infant pulse oximetry screening training and implementation and a data collection framework for more than 1,200 health workers, expanding its screening cohort to nearly 300,000 newborns across 200 delivery sites in 10 low- and middle-income countries. It was also among the first formal public/private sector commitments to reduce preventable newborn mortality as part of the UN Secretary General's Every Woman, Every Child initiative. The BORN Project was selected to address the UN Sustainable Development Goals, which address human rights, health equity and innovation.

In 2016, Saarinen was appointed by the U.S. Secretary of Health and Human Services under the Obama administration to the federal Advisory Committee on Heritable Disorders in Newborns and Children (ACHDNC).
