= Nellcor =

United States based provider of pulse oximetry products

- Industry: Medical equipment
- Founded: 1981; 45 years ago
- Founder: William New, Jr., Jack Lloyd, and James Corman
- Fate: Merged with Medtronic
- Headquarters: Hayward, California
- Parent: Medtronic

Nellcor has been a provider of pulse oximetry products since 1981. After a series of acquisitions, the company's brand name and assets are currently owned by Medtronic, which still produces Nellcor-branded sensors and pulse oximeters.

== History ==
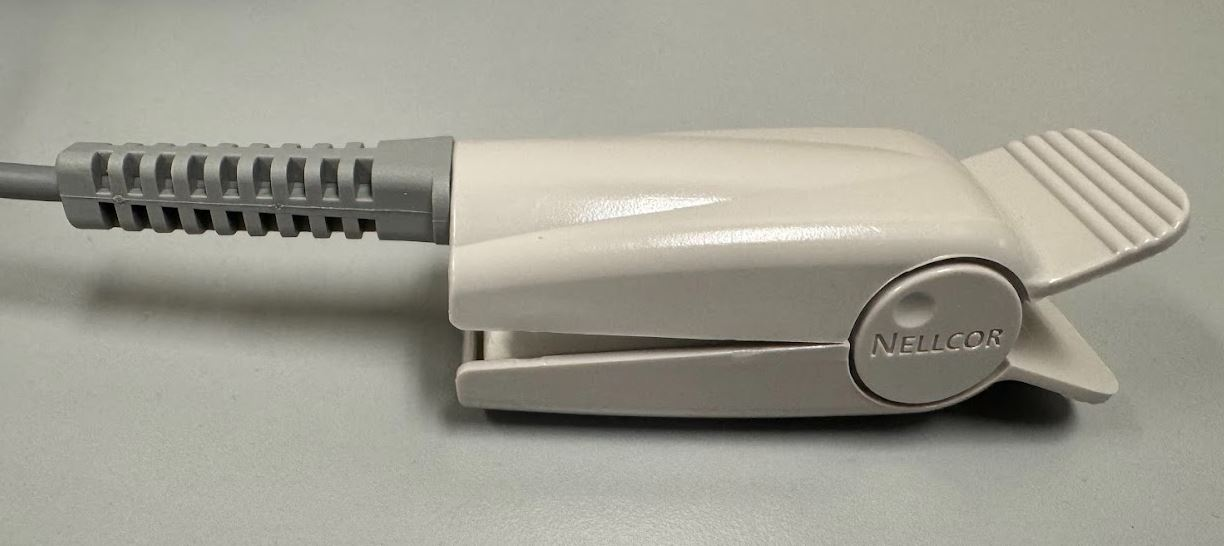
Nellcor DS-100A Finger Sensor

Nellcor was founded in 1981 by Dr. William New, Jr., who was a professor of anesthesiology at Stanford University. William had done research at Stanford to find ways of measuring blood oxygen levels and decided to create Nellcor as a way to build pulse oximeters to measure blood oxygen levels in a non-invasive manner. The name Nellcor was built using the initials of the three co-founders (William New, Jack Lloyd, and James Corman). William also acted as the CEO for the new business venture.

The first product released by Nellcor was the N-100 pulse oximeter, which was designed to operate at the patient's bedside. It was followed by a smaller handheld version, called the N-10 pulse oximeter. For sensors, Nellcor manufactured two types of sensors: a reusable sensor that could clamp onto a patient's finger and a disposable sensor that would use adhesives to wrap around the patient's finger. In both cases, the sensor would read the patient's SpO2 and pulse rate using red LEDs and connected to the pulse oximeter using a cable called a patient module.

The company grew as the clinical value of pulse oximetry became apparent to physicians over time, primarily helping to detect patient deterioration during and after surgery. In 1986, the American Society of Anesthesiologists recommended that every patient using anesthesia should have their arterial oxygen level continuously monitored, helping to establish pulse oximetry as a standard of practice.

In 1987, Nellcor had its initial public offering, and became a public company. The company's stock was traded on the Nasdaq National Market under the symbol NELL.

In 1990, Nellcor acquired Radiant Systems Inc., a private company based in Kansas City, Missouri that developed software for hospital monitoring systems.

In 1991, Nellcor acquired EdenTec, a manufacturer of sleep apnea monitors based in Eden Prairie, Minnesota.

In 1995, Nellcor acquired Puritan Bennett using a $475 million stock swap and the newly expanded company was renamed Nellcor Puritan Bennett. That year, Nellcor also acquired two private companies: Pierre Medical, a French manufacturer of home respiratory products, including non-invasive ventilators and sleep apnea therapy systems and Melville Software, a Canadian manufacturer of sleep diagnostic products

In 1996, Nellcor Puritan Bennett acquired Infrasonics Inc., a San Diego-based manufacturer of ventilators using a stock swap worth $66 million.

In 1997, Nellcor Puritan Bennett was acquired by Mallinckrodt, a medical products company with product lines in respiratory care, diagnostic imaging and analgesic pharmaceuticals. The acquisition price was $28.50 per share for a total price of approximately $1.9 billion.

In 2000, Tyco International acquired Mallinckrodt to become a Tyco Healthcare company.

In 2007, Covidien spun off from Tyco International and inherited Nellcor along with other Tyco Healthcare brands.

In 2015, Medtronic acquired Covidien and inherited all brands, including Nellcor.

In October 2022, Medtronic announced its intention to pursue a separation of the company's combined Patient Monitoring and Respiratory Interventions businesses, which included Nellcor.

In February 2024, Medtronic announced that it had reversed its decision to spin-off or sell the Patient Monitoring and Respiratory Interventions businesses, and would instead combine them into a new business unit called Acute Care & Monitoring. This decision meant that Nellcor products would be manufactured by the AC&M organization within Medtronic. They also announced that they would discontinue the Puritan Bennett ventilator product line, citing its unprofitability.

== Patent infringement lawsuits ==
In 2000, Masimo sued Nellcor, claiming patent infringement on US patent 5769785, US patent 6206830, US patent 6263222, and US patent 6157850. A six-week jury trial was held, which found in favor of Masimo. In 2002, Nellcor filed a counter-lawsuit against Masimo, claiming patent infringement on US patent 4934372, but the court ruled in 2004 that infringement had not occurred.

Both parties sought to overturn the jury decision in district court, then further appealed, with the appeals court deciding in 2005 that the court was affirmed-in-part, reversed-in-part and remanded. As a result, Nellcor agreed to pay Masimo royalties on the sale of its pulse oximeters subject to the infringement lawsuit.

In 2011, Nellcor and Masimo established a royalty deal, which ended the legal dispute and any ongoing infringement lawsuits. This deal cut the royalty percentage to 7.75% on the impacted products through October 6, 2018.

== Pulse oximeters ==
=== N-100 ===
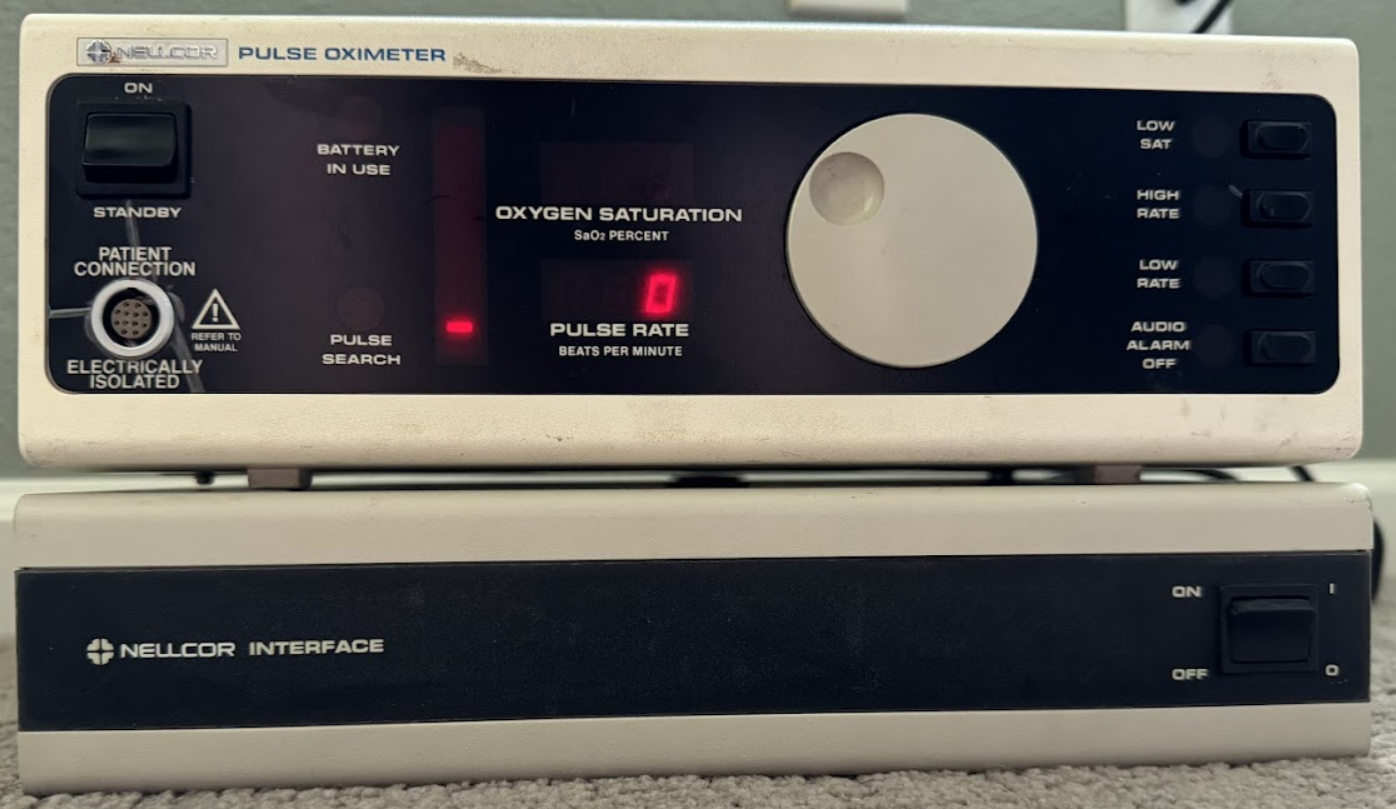
N-100 monitor and N-8000 interface

The N-100 was the first bedside form-factor pulse oximeter released by Nellcor in 1983. The device had red LED displays, which would show the physiologic measurements for SpO2 and pulse rate. It could emit a sound indicator with each beat of the patient's pulse that changed in pitch based on the SpO2 level, helping to alert clinicians when a patient's condition was deteriorating. The user interface consisted of a spinning knob and physical buttons, mainly used to change alarm settings.

=== N-10 ===
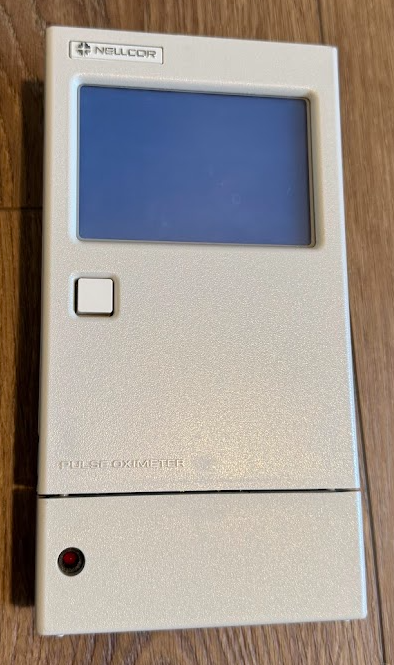
N-10 Handheld Monitor

The N-10 was Nellcor's first handheld form-factor pulse oximeter, released in 1985. It consisted of a blocky plastic box, with LED displays. This device did not support configuration of alarm thresholds and only featured one button, to turn the unit on or off. It could be powered by a rechargeable battery pack that plugged into wall outlets or AA batteries. An optional accessory was available to add a small thermal printer to the top of the device.

=== N-200 ===
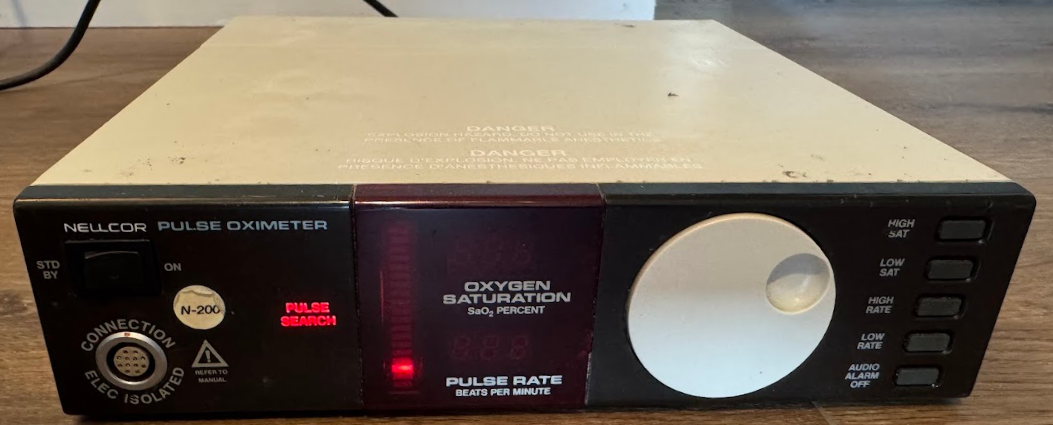
N-200 Monitor

The N-200 was released as a follow-up to the N-100 in 1986. The N-200 featured the C-Lock ECG synchronization feature, which used ECG signals to correlate pulse signals and increase the accuracy of pulse rate measurement. It also featured RS-232 and analog communication ports, which allowed connection to central monitoring systems and printers.

=== N-180 ===
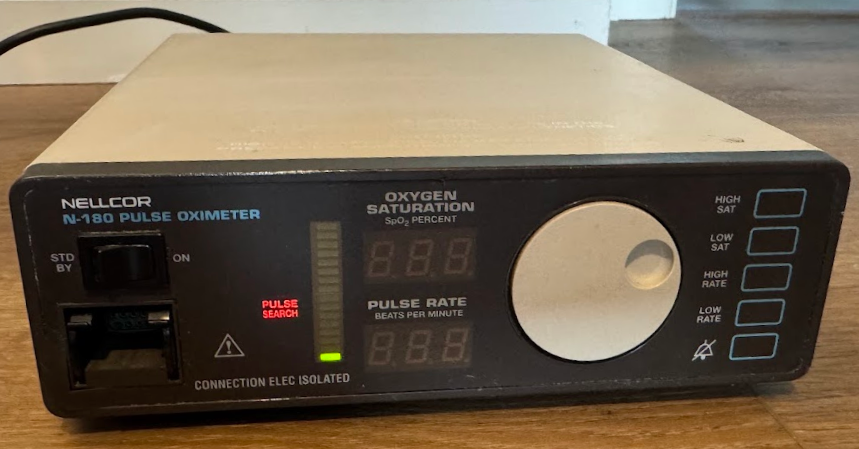
N-180 Monitor

The N-180 was a bedside form-factor pulse oximeter released in 1987.

=== N-20 ===
The N-20 was an updated handheld pulse oximeter, released in 1993. It featured a more compact design and lighter weight compared to the original N-10.

=== N-3000 ===
The N-3000 was released in 1995. It was called the "Symphony" and included optional modules that could be stacked for non-invasive blood pressure measurement (N-3100) and waveform display and printing (N-3200).

=== N-400 ===
The N-400 was released in 2000 and focused on fetal oxygen saturation monitoring. This device was capable of measuring SpO2 and pulse rate in fetuses, while still in the womb.

== OEM partnerships ==
Nellcor also sells OEM oximetry modules to third party patient monitor manufacturers, so they can incorporate Nellcor technology into their devices. OEM partner companies have included GE Healthcare, Philips, Spacelabs Healthcare, Welch Allyn and Nihon Kohden.
