= Maurice Visscher =

Physiologist

- Born: August 25, 1901; Holland, Michigan, US
- Died: May 1, 1983 (aged 81)
- Citizenship: American
- Education: Hope College; University of Minnesota; University of Southern California
- Spouse: Gertrude Pieters (m. 1925)
- Children: Two sons and two daughters
- Scientific career
- Fields: Physiology
- Institutions: University of Minnesota
- Academic advisors: Anton Julius Carlson; Ernest Starling
- Doctoral students: Earl Wood

Maurice Bolks Visscher (August 25, 1901 – May 1, 1983) was an American cardiovascular physiologist. He is best known for demonstrating that cardiac muscle declines in efficiency as it fails, and for pioneering the use of isotopes to study electrolyte absorption in the small intestine.

== Early life and education ==
Visscher was born on August 25, 1901, in Holland, Michigan. He was the fourth of six children in a Dutch Calvinist family. He attended Holland's Hope College, graduating in 1922, then studied physiology at the University of Minnesota where he earned a Ph.D., in 1925. He spent the next year doing research at the University of London with Ernest Starling. In 1926, he conducted physiological research with Anton Julius Carlson at the University of Chicago. He earned his M.D. from the University of Southern California in 1931.

== Academic career ==
Visscher was an assistant professor at the University of Tennessee from 1927 to 1929. He joined the faculty of University of Southern California, where he was associate professor and chair of the Department of Physiology and Pharmacology from 1929 to 1931. He then served as the chairman of the physiology department at the University of Illinois College of Medicine until 1936, when he became the head of the physiology department at the University of Minnesota, a position he held until his retirement. Upon retiring in 1968, he became a Regents' Professor at the University of Minnesota, and was granted the status of emeritus professor in 1970. He then moved to another laboratory, where he continued to conduct research until his death. His doctoral students at the University of Minnesota included Gordon Moe and Earl Wood.

== Professional affiliations ==
Visscher was the 20th president of the American Physiological Society, serving from 1948 to 1949. He was elected a member of the National Academy of Sciences in 1956, the American Academy of Arts and Sciences in 1964, and the American Philosophical Society in 1970. He also served as a co-founder and president of the National Society for Medical Research, as secretary general of the International Union of Physiological Sciences, and as founding chairman of the American Association for Accreditation of Laboratory Animal Care.

== Activism ==
An outspoken humanist, Visscher contributed a regular column to The Humanist from 1942 to 1954 and signed the Humanist Manifesto II in 1973. He served as chairman of the organization Minnesotans against the War in Vietnam, which placed an anti-Vietnam War advertisement in the Minneapolis Star-Tribune in 1967. He was also an avid defender of academic freedom and opponent of McCarthyism. As a board member of the Unitarian Service Committee (USC) during World War II, he organized and headed the "Nutrition Mission", a collaborative mission between the USC and the United Nations Relief and Rehabilitation Administration. The mission, launched in 1945, was aimed at researching malnutrition in Italy. He was a volunteer medical advisor to Group Health in the 1950s.

== Personal life ==
Visscher married Gertrude Pieters on August 12, 1925. They had two sons and two daughters.

Though raised a Calvinist, Visscher converted to Unitarianism in 1934, when he became a member of the Third Unitarian Church of Chicago. He later credited the rigid doctrines of Calvinism with instilling a lifelong sense of urgency in him.

He died of cancer on May 1, 1983.
