= Puritan Bennett =

United States based provider of respiratory products

Puritan-Bennett
- Industry: Pharmaceuticals
- Predecessor: Oxygen Gas Company, Puritan Compressed Gas Corporation
- Founded: 1913; 113 years ago
- Founder: Ray Bennett
- Key people: Richard H. Anderson, President and CEO
- Products: Bennett MA-1 Volume Ventilator
- Owner: Medtronic
- Website: www.puritanbennett.com

Puritan Bennett has been a provider of respiratory products since 1913 originally as a medical gas supplier. In addition to critical care ventilation, Puritan Bennett provided medical devices for patients outside of the acute care environment. Its products included portable ventilation, oxygen therapy systems, sleep diagnostic and sleep therapy equipment, spirometry and other respiratory care products.

== History ==
In 1913, Parker B. Francis founded the predecessor to Puritan-Bennett, originally incorporated as Oxygen Gas Company, which was a manufacturer and distributor of oxygen and hydrogen. In 1920 the company changed its name to the Kansas City Oxygen Company and then again in 1931 to Puritan Compressed Gas Corporation as it continued to expand. In 1940, V. Ray Bennett and Associates, Inc was founded by Ray Bennett in Santa Monica, CA. In 1945 Bennett applies for a patent for the BR-X2 ventilator developed during WWII for delivery of intermittent positive pressure ventilation to pilots after he witnessed several crashes caused by pilots passing out in unpressurized aircraft at high altitude. He would later invent a mechanical ventilator as an alternative to the iron lung machine. V. Ray Bennett and Associates, Inc was acquired by Puritan in 1956 and the next year the company was renamed Bennett Respiration Products, Inc. By the 60's the company had added products such as the bubble jet and a heated humidifier to its oxygen therapy line. In 1967 Puritan released the MA-1 Volume Ventilator, an invention of Bennet's. This virtually replaced the cumbersome iron lung and made Bennet and Puritan recognizable names in the larger medical equipment field. This allowed the company to grow even more as they targeted international markets. In 1968 the parent company reorganized itself as the Puritan-Bennett Corporation and consolidated its medical marketing department into a single unit.

In 1995, Nellcor acquired Puritan-Bennett and the newly expanded company was renamed Nellcor Puritan Bennett. In 1997, Nellcor Puritan Bennett became a part of Mallinckrodt, a medical products company with product lines in respiratory care, diagnostic imaging and analgesic pharmaceuticals. In 1998, Puritan-Bennett Aero Systems (PBASCO) was sold to BE Aerospace Inc.

In 2000, Tyco International acquired Mallinckrodt to become a Tyco Healthcare company. In 2007, Covidien spun off from Tyco International and inherited Puritan Bennett along with other Tyco Healthcare Brands.

In 2015, Medtronic acquired Covidien and inherited all brands, including Puritan Bennett.

On February 20 2024, Medtronic announced that it will discontinue Puritan Bennett ventilators and exit the ventilator business.

== Ventilators ==
=== 980 Ventilator System ===
The 980 model was released in 2014 and became the final ventilator produced under the Puritan Bennett brand before the ventilator business was discontinued by Medtronic.

=== 840 Ventilator System ===
The 840 model was released in 1998 and offered three modes of ventilation: Assist/Control, Spontaneous, and Synchronous Intermittent Mandatory Ventilation.

==== Software Options ====
- PAV+ Software
- BiLevel Software
- Volume Ventilation Plus Software
- Tube Compensation Software
- NeoMode Software

=== 700 Series ===
The 700 Series (740 & 760) Ventilator System is a critical care ventilator model prior to the 840 Series. The system was designed in Galway, Ireland.

=== 7200 Series ===
The 7200 Series is a critical care ventilator model prior to the 760 Series.

=== 560 Series ===
The 560 Series is a portable ventilation unit.

=== Bennett MA-1 ===
The Bennett MA-1 ventilator was a volume-cycled, constant flow generator that had three adjustable modes: assist, control, or assist-control. This model was the most commonly used ventilators in clinical practice.

=== Bennett TV-2P and Bennett PR-2 ===
Oldest devices utilised for intermittent positive-pressure breathing (IPPB) therapy. These models were used in WW2 because the units were small, compact and easy to use.
