= Nihon Kohden =

Medical device company

Nihon Kohden Corporation
- Native name: 日本光電工業株式会社
- Company type: Public KK
- Traded as: TYO: 6849
- Industry: Medical equipment
- Founded: Tokyo (August 7, 1951; 74 years ago)
- Founder: Yoshio Ogino
- Headquarters: Nishiochiai, Shinjuku-ku, Tokyo 161-8560, Japan
- Key people: Fumio Suzuki (Chairman and CEO); Hirokazu Ogino (President and COO)
- Products: Physiological measuring equipment; Diagnostic information systems
- Revenue: ▲JPY 160.8 billion (FY 2014) (US$ 1.35 billion) (FY 2014)
- Net income: ▼JPY 11.1 billion (FY 2014) (US$ 92.5 million) (FY 2014)
- Number of employees: 4,616 (as of March 31, 2015)
- Website: Official website

Nihon Kohden Corporation (日本光電工業株式会社, Nihon Kōdenkōgyō Kabushiki-gaisha) is a Tokyo-based leading manufacturer, developer and distributor of medical electronic equipment, which include EEGs, EMG measuring systems, ECGs, patient monitors, Invasive and Non-Invasive Ventilators, Defibrillators, AEDs and clinical information systems, with subsidiaries in the U.S., Europe and Asia. The company's products are now used in more than 120 countries, and it is the largest supplier of EEG products worldwide.

In 1972, Takuo Aoyagi, a researcher at the company, invented and patented the basic principles of pulse oximetry. Two years later he developed the world's first pulse oximeter, the OLV-5100, which has helped improve patient safety during anaesthesia.
