= K. A. Saarinen =

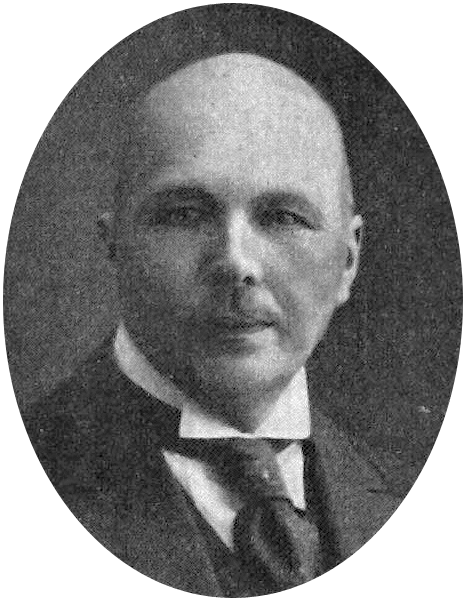

Member of the Eduskunta

Personal details
- Born: October 16, 1869 Iitti
- Died: November 9, 1932 (aged 63) Turku
- Party: SDP
- Occupation: Land-surveyor engineer, judge

Gustaf Adolf (Kustaa Adolf, K. A.) Saarinen (October 16, 1869 – November 9, 1932) was a Finnish land surveyor and lawyer that served in the Eduskunta as a member of the Social Democratic Party of Finland from 1910 to 1911.

== Life and career ==
Saarinen's parents were master builder Gustaf Adolf Saarinen (born 1838) and Hilda Karolina Vinter (1840–1872). He passed the matriculation exam (Finland) at Vaasan yksityislyseo (Vaasa Private High School) in 1890 and began a course in land surveying at the Helsinki University of Technology in 1895. Between 1895 and 1897, Saarinen worked as the land surveyor of Oulu, and between 1897 and 1920 he worked as the land surveyor of Turku and Pori. Saarinen worked as a land surveyor when he was younger and as a land surveyor-engineer when he was older.

In 1916, Saarinen began to study law at the University of Helsinki. He passed the bar and received the title of Varatuomari in 1919. From 1917 to 1918, Saarinen also worked as the vice-governor of the province of Häme. From 1920 to 1926, Saarinen worked as the temporary chair of the land-distribution court of Turku. From 1926 to 1932, he worked in Mikkeli as the chair of the land-distribution court of Viipuri.

While living in Tyrvää, Saarinen was elected as a member of the Eduskunta in the SDP in the 1910 Finnish Parliamentary Election. Saarinen died after a long illness in Turku in 1932. He was 63 years old.

== Family ==
Saarinen's wife was Elli Salonen, who was born in 1872 in Keuruu. Saarinen and Salonen were married in 1896.
