= Earl Wood =

American physiologist (1912–2009)

Earl H. Wood
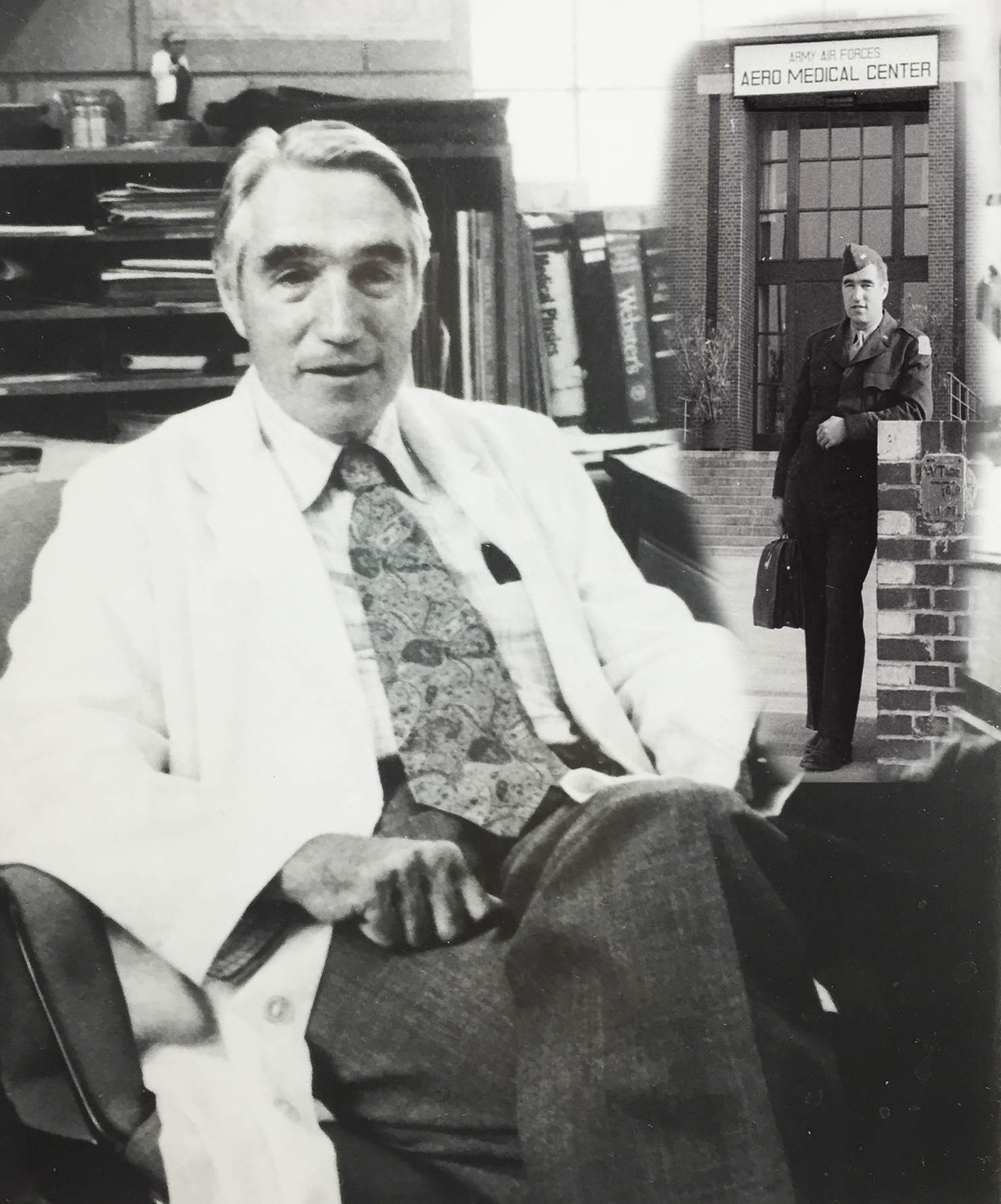
- Earl Wood in his office at the Mayo Clinic with an inset photo from 1946 showing him in Heidelberg, as part of Operation Paperclip, seeking to recruit German scientists to work in the United States.
- Born: January 1, 1912; Mankato, Minnesota
- Died: March 18, 2009 (aged 97); Rochester, Minnesota
- Citizenship: United States
- Education: Macalester College; University of Minnesota
- Known for: Invention of the G-suit, Development of cardiac catheterization into a clinical service, Invention of the ear oximeter, Co-inventor of the first dynamic (high speed) volumetric x-ray computed tomography system
- Awards: Presidential Certificate of Merit from Harry Truman-1947; Macalester College honorary degree of D.Sc.-1950; American Heart Association's "Career Investigator" 1962; Distinguished Citizen Award-1974; honorary member of the Royal Netherlands Academy of Arts and Sciences-1977; honorary member American College of Cardiology - 1978; honorary degree, doctor of medicine, from the University of Bern, Switzerland - 1978; Humboldt Prize for Senior U.S. Scientists by the government of West Germany - 1979; John Phillips Memorial Award of the American College of Physicians - 1979; President of the American Physiological Society - 1980-81; President of the Federation of American Societies for Experimental Biology (FASEB) - 1981-82; John Phillips Memorial Award of the American College of Physicians 1982; Aerospace Medical Association's Lyster Award for outstanding achievement in Aerospace medicine 1983; Ray G. Daggs Award for his distinguished long-term service to the science of physiology and, in particular, to the American Physiological Society - 1995; Street in Rheinfelden, Germany dedicated as "Earl H. Wood Strasse" - 2002.
- Scientific career
- Fields: Cardiovascular, Respiratory, Aerospace Medicine and Cardiovascular and Pulmonary Dynamics
- Workplaces: Mayo Clinic; Rochester, Minnesota
- Thesis: The Distribution of Electrolytes and Water Between Cardiac Muscle and Blood Serum with Special Reference to the Effects of Digitalis (1942)

Earl Howard Wood (January 1, 1912 – March 18, 2009) was an American cardiopulmonary physiologist who helped invent the G-suit, brought heart catheterization into a clinical reality and introduced dynamic volumetric computed tomography for the study of the heart and lungs.

== Career ==
=== G-suit ===
Shortly after receiving an M.D. and PhD in physiology from the University of Minnesota medical school under the mentorship of Professor Maurice B. Visscher, MD, Wood became a key member of a team, working in a laboratory at the Mayo Clinic, tasked with helping military pilots and flight crew survive and function in high G-force environments. Based upon extensive physiologic testing via use of the human centrifuge installed at the Mayo Clinic, it was determined that blackout and then unconsciousness was caused by reduction of blood flow to the eyes first and then the brain. The solutions the team arrived at were the M-1 breath hold maneuver and the G-suit. The M-1 maneuver consisted of a strained exhalation effort against a closed glottis designed to increase left ventricular pressure. (Although the references given are dated 1946-7, the work was performed much before then. In, see the acknowledgments section explaining the closed nature of the research with restrictions placed on publication during the war. During the war effort the Mayo Clinic laboratory was operating with government Confidential secrecy.) The G suit was a garment, produced by the David Clark Company, which has air bladders situated at the calves, thighs, and abdomen of the wearer. The bladders inflate as the G-force acting on the aircraft increase, constricting the wearer's arteries, hence increasing blood pressure and blood flow to the brain.

The G-suit was a superior solution to another alternative (a water-filled suit) being tested at the time, which was considered impractically heavy and cumbersome. The water-filled, pulsatile pressure suits were developed to effect venous return. However, Wood and colleagues' detailed physiologic measurements demonstrated that what was required was augmentation of arterial pressure.

Wood himself regularly tested the flight suits, taking many turns in a human centrifuge and plane dubbed the "G-wiz". He calculated that during more than a thousand rides, he had lost consciousness for an aggregate of at least fifteen minutes (without any observed lasting damage). Wood was awarded a Presidential Certificate of Merit by Harry Truman in 1947.

The G-suit was adopted in the 1940s. The current models are based on the pattern Wood and his colleagues designed. Following World War II, Wood was recruited to participate in what was known as "Operation Paperclip" The goal was to keep the top German scientists away from Russia and working for the United States.

In 1962, Wood was the tenth scientist to be named "Career Investigator," of the American Heart Association. These funds allowed Wood considerable flexibility in regards to the directions of his research.

=== Other work ===
After his work on the G-Suit, Wood worked on techniques for measuring cardiac blood flow. He was granted a patent for the ear oximeter, an optical instrument that measures blood oxygen levels without taking blood by examining the variation of light absorption as a function of oxygen saturation of hemoglobin. Integral to the work leading to the development of the G suit was the perfection of vascular catheterization methods needed to understand the distribution of blood pressure and flow. Shortly after the end of World War II, open-heart surgery emerged with the Mayo contribution to the development of the heart-lung bypass machine initially developed by Gibbons and perfected by Wood and colleagues. Wood's work at the Mayo Clinic lead to the development of many technologies allowing for the assessment of the heart and lungs including dye dilution methods serving to characterize cardiac output, methods for the assessment of central blood volume, the calculation of pulmonary vascular resistance (known as the "Wood Unit" and calculated by subtracting pulmonary capillary wedge pressure from the mean pulmonary arterial pressure and dividing by the cardiac output), analog subtraction angiography, and eventually the Dynamic Spatial Reconstructor (DSR), a predecessor to modern high speed volumetric computed tomography (CT) allowing for the evaluation of the beating heart and breathing lungs. The DSR comprised 14 X-ray tubes and a hemicylindrical fluorescent screen imaged by 14 associated television cameras.

In all, Wood is noted for his contributions (together with members of the Biodynamics Research Unit (BRU), under his direction, within the physiology and biophysics department at the Mayo Clinic) in the following areas:

- methods for protection against blackout and unconsciousness during high G-forces
- methods for heart catheterizations;
- methods for monitoring vascular pressures;
- the pulse oximeter for real time non-invasive monitoring or arterial oxygen saturation;
- methods for calculation of pulmonary vascular resistance (Wood Unit);
- methods for the digital conversion of analog physiologic signals allowing for computer-based monitoring of vascular signals (using the early computer developments of IBM which was just down the road from Wood's laboratory);
- methods for liquid fluorocarbon respiration explored for protection against high G forces expected during rocket launch and re-entry while leaving and returning to Earth's atmosphere in space exploration;
- methods for the assessment of pleural pressure to determine regional gravitational effects on the lung;
- indicator dilution curve methodology for the assessment of cardiac output and other physiologic derivative;
- indocyanine green dye for use in the indicator dilution method;
- analog subtraction angiography for the assessment of cardiac structures via video fluoroscopy and
- the earliest predecessor (The Dynamic Spatial Reconstructor) of modern high speed, multi-source / multi-detector row computed tomography for the non-invasive imaging of the beating heart and breathing lungs.

Wood's publication list, with more than 700 entries, is a testament to the number of fellows who trained under him and who became prominent researchers in their own right.

== Early life ==
Earl Wood was born to Inez Goff and William Clark Wood in Mankato, Minnesota on January 1, 1912 and started life on a subsistence farm. William Wood, in addition to farming, was a real estate businessman. Earl Wood earned a B.A. in Mathematics and Chemistry from Macalester College in 1934, and his MD degree and a PhD degree in physiology from the University of Minnesota. Earl was one of 5 brothers (Earl, Chester, Delbert, Harland and Abe) and a sister, Louise.

== Family ==
All of Earl Wood's siblings grew up to be highly accomplished. Louise A. Wood was awarded the Medal of Freedom by President Truman for her services as overseas director of the American Red Cross during World War II. and became the executive director of the Girl Scouts of the USA from 1961 to 1972. Harland G. Wood was the first director of the department of biochemistry at the school of medicine and dean of sciences, Case Western Reserve University. As a biochemist, he was notable for proving in 1935 that animals, humans and bacteria utilized carbon dioxide and received the National Medal of Science. Chester was a teacher and a university administrator; Delbert was, in succession, a lawyer, a Federal Bureau of Investigation agent, and a railway executive; Abe was an internist and founder of a Colorado-based medical clinic. Not surprisingly, in 1950, Earl Wood's mother, Inez, was awarded the title of "Minnesota Mother of the Year." Earl and his wife, Ada, had a daughter, Phoebe and three sons, Mark, Guy and E. Andrew.
