= Physiology (journal) =

- Discipline: Physiology
- Language: English
- Edited by: Gary C. Sieck

Publication details
- Former name(s): News in Physiological Sciences
- History: 1986–present
- Publisher: American Physiological Society (United States)
- Frequency: Bimonthly
- Impact factor: 4.857 (2014)

Standard abbreviations
- ISO 4: Physiology
- NLM: Physiology (Bethesda)

Indexing
- ISSN: 1548-9213 (print); 1548-9221 (web)
- LCCN: 2004212166
- OCLC no.: 54517439

Links
- Journal homepage; Online access; Online archives

Physiology is a peer-reviewed scientific journal on physiology published by the American Physiological Society and the International Union of Physiological Societies. Before August 2003, it was named News in Physiological Sciences. The current editor-in-chief is Gary C. Sieck (Mayo Clinic).
