= Sakari Saarinen =

Finnish footballer (born 1978)

Personal information
- Date of birth: 18 July 1978 (age 48)
- Place of birth: Tampere, Finland
- Height: 1.78 m (5 ft 10 in)
- Position: Midfielder

Senior career*
Years	Team	Apps	(Gls)
1997–1999	TPV	66	(1)
2000–2011	Tampere United	243	(18)
2011	RoPS	18	(1)
2012	KTP	16	(0)
2013–2014	FC Haka	53	(3)
2015	NoPS	1	(0)
- * Club domestic league appearances and goals

Sakari Saarinen (born 18 July 1978) is a Finnish former footballer. Saarinen played mostly in midfield, but occasionally also as a defender. In the Finnish premier league Saarinen has played 286 matches and scored 19 goals.
