= Newborn Foundation =

US non-profit organization

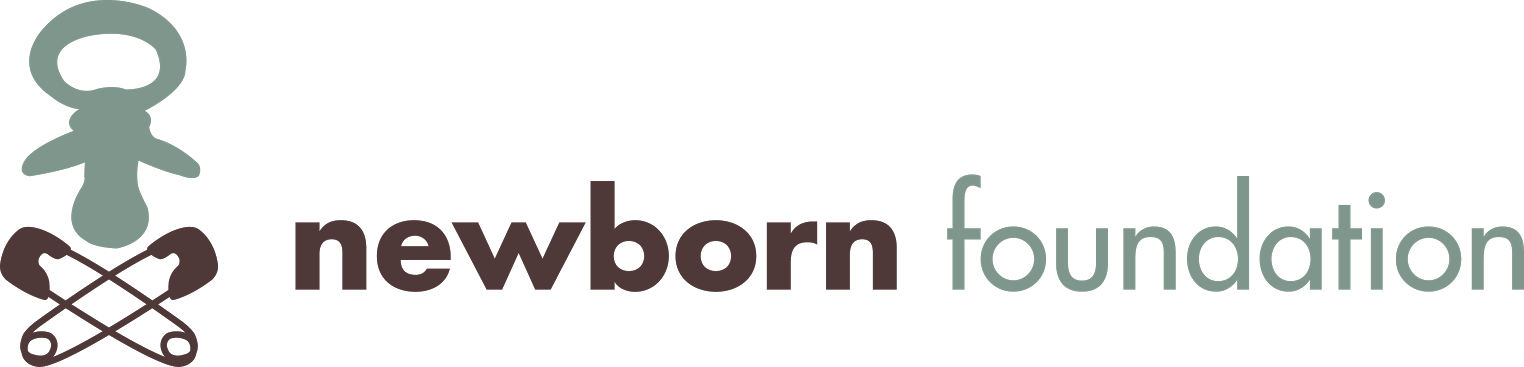
The Newborn Foundation logo

The Newborn Foundation is a Minnesota-based international 501(c)(3) non-profit organization that advocates for newborn screening and works to develop and implement programs, technologies and policies that reduce infant mortality. The organization has played a part in the addition of universal newborn pulse oximetry (CCHD) screening to the federal Routine Uniform Screening Panel (RUSP).

== Background ==
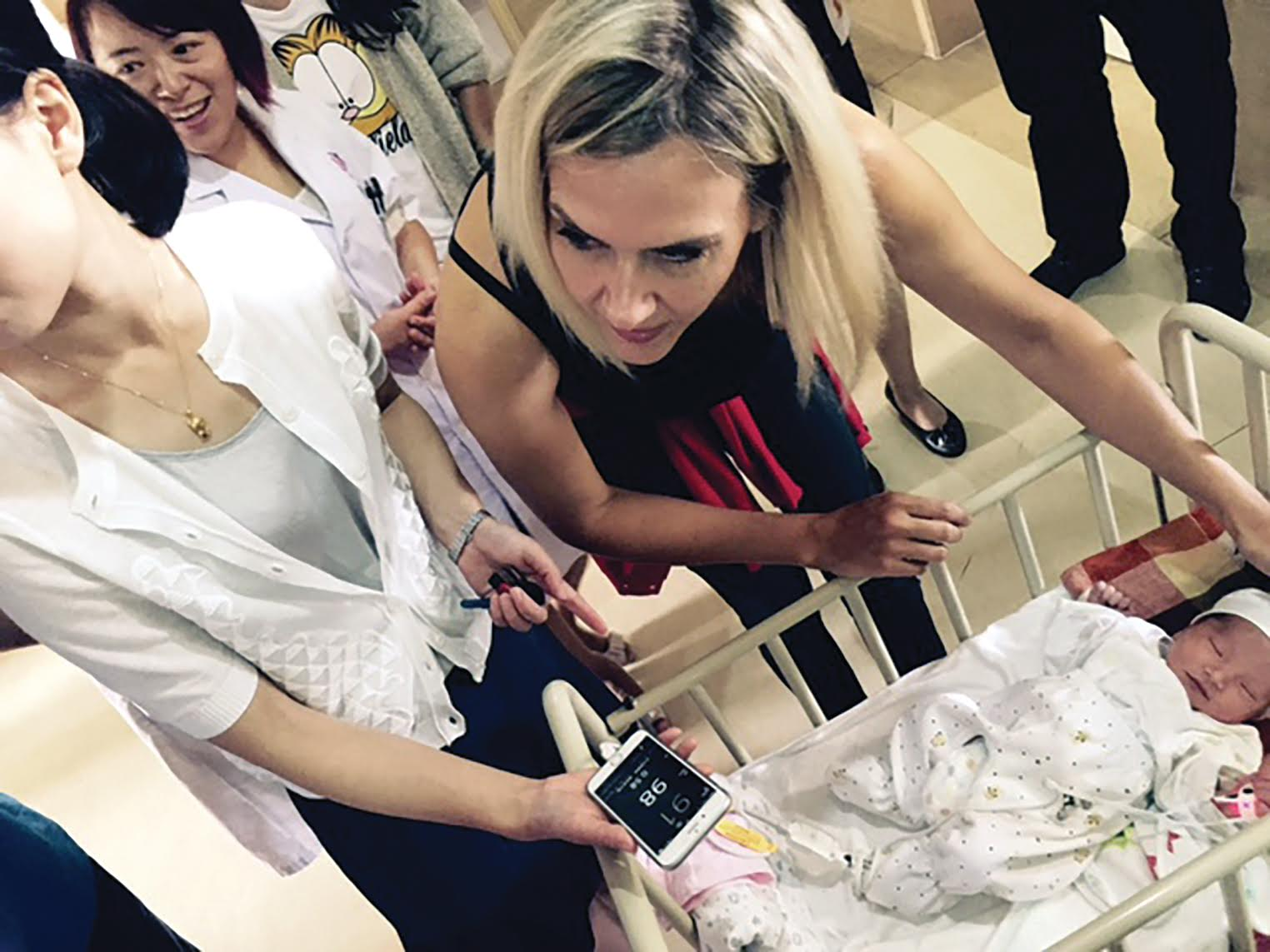
Annamarie Saarinen uses a mobile phone pulse oximeter to screen a newborn at Beichuan People's Hospital in Sichuan, China.

The Newborn Foundation is credited with persuading the United States Department of Health and Human Services to formally recommend universal pulse oximetry screening for congenital heart defects in every child born in the United States. Annamarie Saarinen co-founded the Newborn Foundation in 2010 after her daughter, Eve Saarinen, was nearly discharged from the hospital nursery with an undetected critical congenital heart defect (CCHD). Saarinen and co-founder Jim Bialick formed the Newborn Coalition, a 501(c)(4) non-profit organization, in 2010 and launched the Newborn Foundation shortly thereafter to work on advocacy and policies in newborn screening and the deployment of medical technologies to reduce infant mortality.

Since 2012, the Foundation has awarded the Hubert H. Humphrey "Dawn of Life” Award to four U.S. policymakers. It has also presented the R. Rodney Howell Award for Newborn Health and the EVE Innovation Award for achievements in newborn screening, research, policy and technology.

== BORN project ==
After successfully implementing policies in the United States, the Newborn Foundation launched the BORN (Birth Oximetry Routine for Newborns) project, a global health initiative that aims to bring newborn screening resources and policy frameworks to low- and middle-income countries (LMICs).

The BORN Project was among the first joint commitments to the United Nations Secretary General's Every Woman, Every Child (EWEC) initiative. Developed in partnership with Masimo, the project deployed the first mobile device-enabled pulse oximeters. In September 2015, the BORN project was selected by the United Nations and the White House as one of 14 innovation projects to be highlighted during the UN General Assembly as helping achieve the UN Sustainable Development Goals by 2030.
