= Pulse oximetry =

Measurement of blood oxygen saturation

- A pulse oximeter.
- Purpose: Monitoring a person's oxygen saturation

Pulse oximetry is a noninvasive method for monitoring blood oxygen saturation. Peripheral oxygen saturation (SpO_{2}) readings are typically within 2% accuracy (within 4% accuracy in 95% of cases) of the more accurate (and invasive) reading of arterial oxygen saturation (SaO_{2}) from arterial blood gas analysis.

A standard pulse oximeter passes two wavelengths of light through tissue to a photodetector. Taking advantage of the pulsate flow of arterial blood, it measures the change in absorbance over the course of a cardiac cycle, allowing it to determine the absorbance due to arterial blood alone, excluding unchanging absorbance due to venous blood, skin, bone, muscle, fat, and, in many cases, nail polish. The two wavelengths measure the quantities of bound (oxygenated) and unbound (non-oxygenated) hemoglobin, and from their ratio, the percentage of bound hemoglobin is computed. The most common approach is transmissive pulse oximetry. In this approach, one side of a thin part of the patient's body, usually a fingertip or earlobe, is illuminated, and the photodetector is on the other side. Fingertips and earlobes have disproportionately high blood flow relative to their size, in order to keep warm, but this will be lacking in hypothermic patients. Other convenient sites include an infant's foot or an unconscious patient's cheek or tongue.

Reflectance pulse oximetry is a less common alternative, placing the photodetector on the same surface as the illumination. This method does not require a thin section of the person's body and therefore may be used almost anywhere on the body, such as the forehead, chest, or feet, but it still has some limitations. Vasodilation and pooling of venous blood in the head due to compromised venous return to the heart can cause a combination of arterial and venous pulsations in the forehead region and lead to spurious SpO_{2} results. Such conditions occur while undergoing anaesthesia with endotracheal intubation and mechanical ventilation or in patients in the Trendelenburg position.

== Medical uses ==
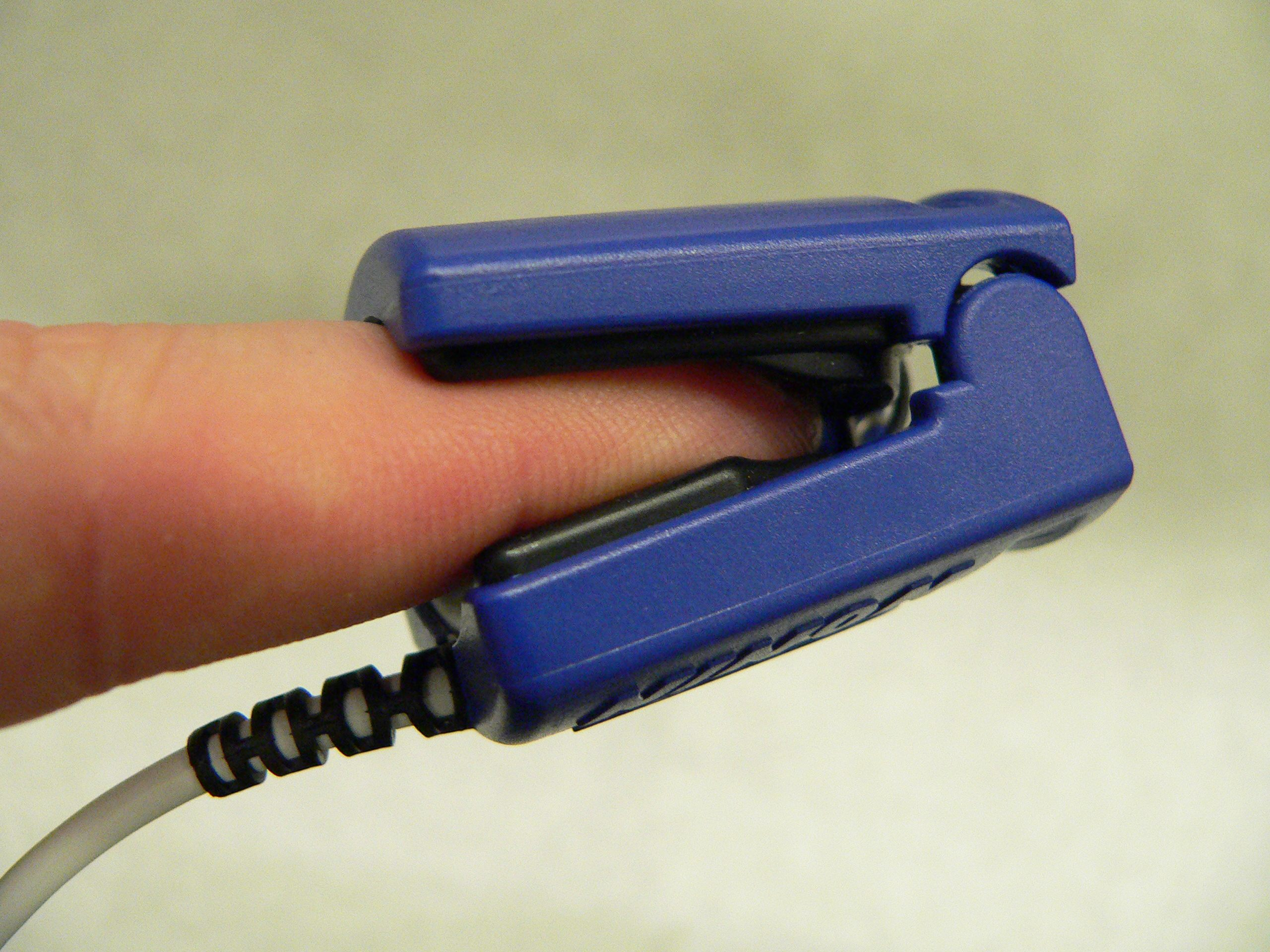
A pulse oximeter probe applied to a person's finger

A pulse oximeter is a medical device that indirectly monitors the oxygen saturation of a patient's blood (as opposed to measuring oxygen saturation directly through a blood sample) and changes in blood volume in the skin, producing a photoplethysmogram that may be further processed into other measurements. The pulse oximeter may be incorporated into a multiparameter patient monitor. Most monitors also display the pulse rate. Portable, battery-operated pulse oximeters are also available for transport or home blood-oxygen monitoring.

=== Advantages ===
Pulse oximetry is particularly convenient for noninvasive continuous measurement of blood oxygen saturation. In contrast, blood gas levels must otherwise be determined in a laboratory on a drawn blood sample. Pulse oximetry is useful in any setting where a patient's oxygenation is unstable, including intensive care, operating, recovery, emergency and hospital ward settings, pilots in unpressurized aircraft, for assessment of any patient's oxygenation, and determining the effectiveness of or need for supplemental oxygen. Although a pulse oximeter is used to monitor oxygenation, it cannot determine the metabolism of oxygen, or the amount of oxygen being used by a patient. For this purpose, it is necessary to also measure carbon dioxide (CO_{2}) levels. It is possible that it can also be used to detect abnormalities in ventilation. However, the use of a pulse oximeter to detect hypoventilation is impaired with the use of supplemental oxygen, as it is only when patients breathe room air that abnormalities in respiratory function can be detected reliably with its use. Therefore, the routine administration of supplemental oxygen may be unwarranted if the patient is able to maintain adequate oxygenation in room air, since it can result in hypoventilation going undetected.

Because of their simplicity of use and the ability to provide continuous and immediate oxygen saturation values, pulse oximeters are of critical importance in emergency medicine and are also very useful for patients with respiratory or cardiac problems, especially COPD, or for diagnosis of some sleep disorders such as apnea and hypopnea. For patients with obstructive sleep apnea, pulse oximetry readings will be in the 70–90% range for much of the time spent attempting to sleep.

Portable battery-operated pulse oximeters are useful for pilots operating in non-pressurized aircraft above 10,000 feet (3,000 m) or 12,500 feet (3,800 m) in the U.S. where supplemental oxygen is required. Portable pulse oximeters are also useful for mountain climbers and athletes whose oxygen levels may decrease at high altitudes or with exercise. Some portable pulse oximeters employ software that charts a patient's blood oxygen and pulse, serving as a reminder to check blood oxygen levels.

Connectivity advancements have made it possible for patients to have their blood oxygen saturation continuously monitored without a cabled connection to a hospital monitor, without sacrificing the flow of patient data back to bedside monitors and centralized patient surveillance systems.

For patients with COVID-19, pulse oximetry helps with early detection of silent hypoxia, in which the patients still look and feel comfortable, but their SpO_{2} is dangerously low. This happens to patients either in the hospital or at home. Low SpO_{2} may indicate severe COVID-19-related pneumonia, requiring a ventilator.

=== Safety ===
Continuous monitoring with pulse oximetry is generally considered safe for most patients for up to 8 hours. However, prolonged use in certain types of patients can cause burns due to the heat emitted by the infrared LED, which reaches up to 43°C. Additionally, pulse oximeters occasionally develop electrical faults which causes them to heat up above this temperature. Patients at greater risk include those with delicate or fragile skin, such as infants, particularly premature infants, and the elderly. Additional risks for injury include lack of pain response where the probe is placed, such as having an insensate limb, or being unconscious or under anesthesia, or having communication difficulties. Patients who are at high risk for injury should have the site of their probe moved frequently, i.e. every hour, whereas patients who are at lower risk should have theirs moved every 2-4 hours.

== Limitations ==
=== Fundamental limitations ===
Pulse oximetry solely measures hemoglobin saturation, not ventilation and is not a complete measure of respiratory sufficiency. It is not a substitute for blood gases checked in a laboratory, because it gives no indication of base deficit, carbon dioxide levels, blood pH, or bicarbonate (HCO_{3}^{−}) concentration. The metabolism of oxygen can readily be measured by monitoring expired CO_{2}, but saturation figures give no information about blood oxygen content. Most of the oxygen in the blood is carried by hemoglobin; in severe anemia, the blood contains less hemoglobin, which despite being saturated cannot carry as much oxygen.

Pulse oximetry also is not a complete measure of circulatory oxygen sufficiency. If there is insufficient bloodflow or insufficient hemoglobin in the blood (anemia), tissues can suffer hypoxia despite high arterial oxygen saturation.

Since pulse oximetry measures only the percentage of bound hemoglobin, a falsely high or falsely low reading will occur when hemoglobin binds to something other than oxygen:

- Hemoglobin has a higher affinity to carbon monoxide than it does to oxygen. Therefore, in cases of carbon monoxide poisoning, most hemoglobin might be bound not to oxygen but to carbon monoxide. A pulse oximeter would correctly report most hemoglobin to be bound, but nevertheless the patient would be in a state of hypoxemia and subsequently hypoxia (low cellular oxygen level).
- Cyanide poisoning gives a high reading because it reduces oxygen extraction from arterial blood. In this case, the reading is not false, as arterial blood oxygen is indeed high early in cyanide poisoning: the patient is not hypoxemic, but is hypoxic.
- Methemoglobinemia characteristically causes pulse oximetry readings in the mid-80s.
- COPD [especially chronic bronchitis] may cause false readings.

A noninvasive method that allows continuous measurement of the dyshemoglobins is the pulse CO-oximeter, which was built in 2005 by Masimo. By using additional wavelengths, it provides clinicians a way to measure the dyshemoglobins, carboxyhemoglobin, and methemoglobin along with total hemoglobin.

=== Conditions affecting accuracy ===
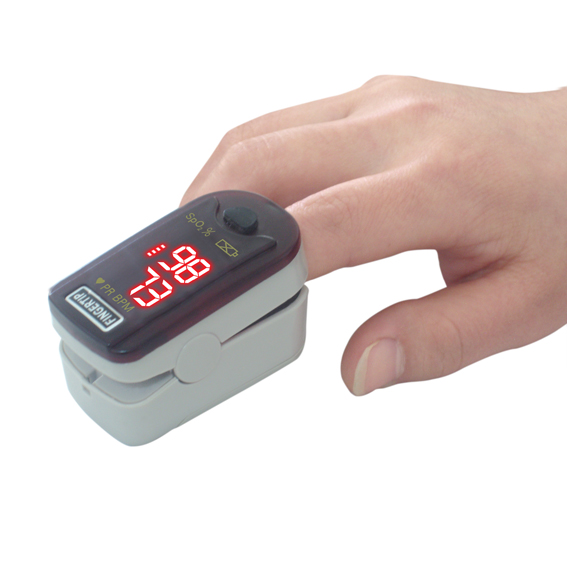
Consumer pulse oxymeter

Because pulse oximeter devices are calibrated for healthy subjects, their accuracy is poor for critically ill patients and preterm newborns. Erroneously low readings may be caused by hypoperfusion of the extremity being used for monitoring (often due to a limb being cold or from vasoconstriction secondary to the use of vasopressor agents); incorrect sensor application; highly calloused skin; or movement (such as shivering), especially during hypoperfusion. To ensure accuracy, the sensor should return a steady pulse and/or pulse waveform. Pulse oximetry technologies differ in their abilities to provide accurate data during conditions of motion and low perfusion. Obesity, hypotension (low blood pressure), and some hemoglobin variants can reduce the accuracy of the results. Some home pulse oximeters have low sampling rates, which can significantly underestimate dips in blood oxygen levels. The accuracy of pulse oximetry deteriorates considerably for readings below 80%. Research has suggested that error rates in common pulse oximeter devices may be higher for adults with dark skin color, leading to claims of encoding systemic racism in countries with multi-racial populations such as the United States. One of the earliest studies on this topic occurred in 1976, which reported reading errors in dark-skinned patients that reflected lower blood oxygen saturation values. Further studies indicate that while accuracy with dark skin is good at higher, healthy saturation levels, some devices overestimate the saturation at lower levels, which may lead to hypoxia not being detected. A study that reviewed thousands of cases of occult hypoxemia, where patients were found to have oxygen saturation below 88% per arterial blood gas measurement despite pulse oximeter readings indicating 92% to 96% oxygen saturation, found that black patients were three times as likely as white patients to have their low oxygen saturation missed by pulse oximeters. Another research study investigated patients in the hospital with COVID-19 and found that occult hypoxemia occurred in 28.5% of black patients compared to only 17.2% of white patients. There has been research to indicate that black COVID-19 patients were 29% less likely to receive supplemental oxygen in a timely manner and three times more likely to have hypoxemia. A further study, which used a MIMIC-IV critical care dataset of both pulse oximeter readings and oxygen saturation levels detected in blood samples, demonstrated that black, Hispanic, and Asian patients had higher SpO_{2} readings than white patients for a given blood oxygen saturation level measured in blood samples. As a result, black, Hispanic, and Asian patients also received lower rates of supplemental oxygen than white patients. It is suggested that melanin can interfere with the absorption of light used to measure the level of oxygenated blood, often measured from a person's finger. Further studies and computer simulations show that the increased amounts of melanin found in people with darker skin scatter the photons of light used by the pulse oximeters, decreasing the accuracy of the measurements. As the studies used to calibrate the devices typically oversample people with lighter skin, the parameters for pulse oximeters are set based on information that is not equitably balanced to account for diverse skin colors. This inaccuracy can lead to potentially missing people who need treatment, as pulse oximetry is used for the screening of sleep apnea and other types of sleep-disordered breathing, which in the United States are conditions more prevalent among minorities. This bias is a significant concern, as a 2% decrease is important for respiratory rehabilitation, studies of sleep apnea, and athletes performing physical efforts; it can lead to severe complications for the patient, requiring an external oxygen supply or even hospitalization.

Another concern regarding pulse oximetry bias is that insurance companies and hospital systems increasingly use these numbers to inform their decisions. Pulse oximetry measurements are used to identify candidates for reimbursement. Similarly, pulse oximetry data is being incorporated into algorithms for clinicians. Early Warning Scores, which provide a record for analyzing a patient's clinical status and alerting clinicians if needed, incorporate algorithms with pulse oximetry information and can result in misinformed patient records.

=== Equipment ===
==== Consumer pulse oximeters ====
In addition to pulse oximeters for professional use, many inexpensive "consumer" models are available. Opinions vary about the reliability of consumer oximeters; a typical comment is "The research data on home monitors has been mixed, but they tend to be accurate within a few percentage points". Some smart watches with activity tracking incorporate an oximeter function. An article on such devices, in the context of diagnosing COVID-19 infection, quoted João Paulo Cunha of the University of Porto, Portugal: "these sensors are not precise, that's the main limitation ... the ones that you wear are only for the consumer level, not for the clinical level". Pulse oximeters used for diagnosis of conditions such as COVID-19 should be Class IIB medical grade oximeters. Class IIB oximeters can be used on patients of all skin colors, low pigmentation and in the presence of motion. When a pulse oximeter is shared between two patients, to prevent cross-infection it should be cleaned with alcohol wipes after each use or a disposable probe or finger cover should be used.

According to a report by iData Research, the US pulse oximetry monitoring market for equipment and sensors was over $700 million in 2011.

==== Mobile apps ====
Mobile app pulse oximeters use the flashlight and the camera of the phone, instead of infrared light used in conventional pulse oximeters. However, apps do not generate as accurate readings because the camera cannot measure the light reflection at two wavelengths, so the oxygen saturation readings that are obtained through an app on a smartphone are inconsistent for clinical use. At least one study has suggested these are not reliable relative to clinical pulse oximeters.

== Mechanism ==
Absorption spectra of oxygenated hemoglobin (HbO2) and deoxygenated hemoglobin (Hb) for red and infrared wavelengths

Simplified principle of operation of a transmissive LED pulse oximeter

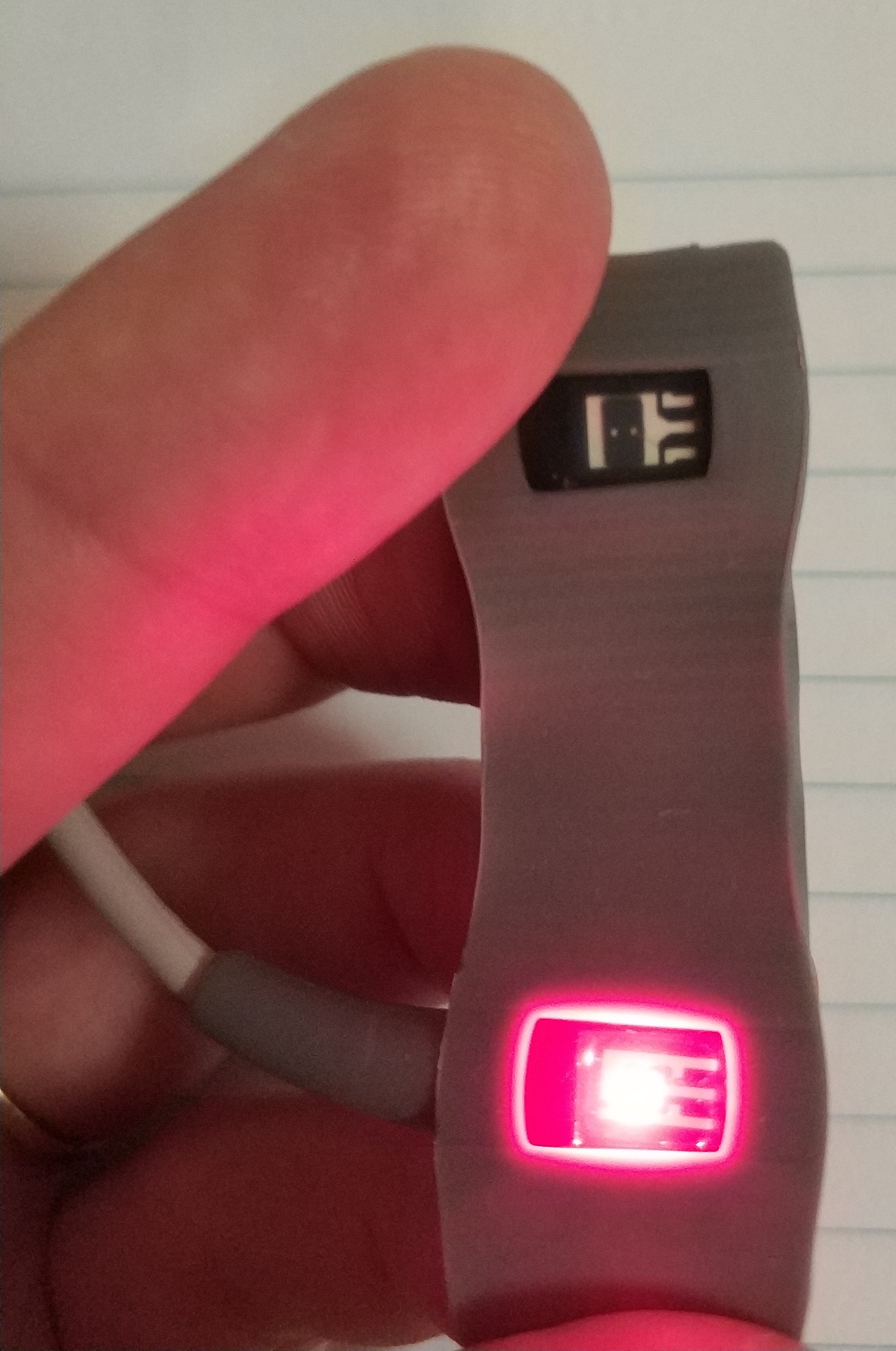
The inner side of a pulse oximeter

A blood-oxygen monitor displays the percentage of blood that is loaded with oxygen. More specifically, it uses light spectrometry to measure what percentage of hemoglobin, the protein in blood that carries oxygen, is loaded. Acceptable normal SpO_{2} ranges for patients without pulmonary pathology are from 95 to 99 percent. For a person breathing room air at or near sea level, an estimate of arterial SpO_{2} can be made from the blood-oxygen monitor "saturation of peripheral oxygen" (SpO_{2}) reading.

=== Mode of operation ===
A typical pulse oximeter uses an electronic processor and a pair of small light-emitting diodes (LEDs) facing a photodiode through a translucent part of the patient's body, usually a fingertip or an earlobe. One LED is red, with wavelength of 660 nm, and the other is infrared with a wavelength of 940 nm. Absorption of light at these wavelengths differs significantly between blood loaded with oxygen and blood lacking oxygen. Oxygenated hemoglobin absorbs more infrared light and allows more red light to pass through. Deoxygenated hemoglobin allows more infrared light to pass through and absorbs more red light. The LEDs sequence through their cycle of one on, then the other, then both off about thirty times per second which allows the photodiode to respond to the red and infrared light separately and also adjust for the ambient light baseline.

The amount of light that is transmitted (in other words, that is not absorbed) is measured, and separate normalized signals are produced for each wavelength. These signals fluctuate in time because the amount of arterial blood that is present increases (literally pulses) with each heartbeat. By subtracting the minimum transmitted light from the transmitted light in each wavelength, the effects of other tissues are corrected for, generating a continuous signal for pulsatile arterial blood. The ratio of the red light measurement to the infrared light measurement is then calculated by the processor (which represents the ratio of oxygenated hemoglobin to deoxygenated hemoglobin), and this ratio is then converted to SpO_{2} by the processor via a lookup table based on the Beer–Lambert law. The Beer-Lambert law also says that the concentration of hemoglobin and the distance that light travels is proportional to the absorbance of light. This principle is often used in UV-Vis spectroscopy, after which this device is modeled. The signal separation also serves other purposes: a plethysmograph waveform ("pleth wave") representing the pulsatile signal is usually displayed for a visual indication of the pulses as well as signal quality, and a numeric ratio between the pulsatile and baseline absorbance ("perfusion index") can be used to evaluate perfusion.

$$\ce{SpO2}=\frac\ce{HbO2}\ce{{HbO2}+Hb}$$

where HbO_{2} is oxygenated hemoglobin (oxyhemoglobin) and Hb is deoxygenated hemoglobin.

=== Derived measurements ===
Due to changes in blood volumes in the skin, a plethysmographic variation can be seen in the light signal received (transmittance) by the sensor on an oximeter. The variation can be described as a periodic function, which in turn can be split into a DC component (the peak value) (Note: This definition used by Masimo varies from the mean value used in signal processing; it is meant to measure the pulsatile arterial blood absorbance over the baseline absorbance.) and an AC component (peak minus trough). The ratio of the AC component to the DC component, expressed as a percentage, is known as the (peripheral) perfusion index (Pi) for a pulse, and typically has a range of 0.02% to 20%. An earlier measurement called the pulse oximetry plethysmographic (POP) only measures the "AC" component, and is derived manually from monitor pixels.

Pleth variability index (PVI) is a measure of the variability of the perfusion index, which occurs during breathing cycles. Mathematically it is calculated as (Pi_{max} − Pi_{min})/Pi_{max} × 100%, where the maximum and minimum Pi values are from one or many breathing cycles. It has been shown to be a useful, noninvasive indicator of continuous fluid responsiveness for patients undergoing fluid management. Pulse oximetry plethysmographic waveform amplitude (ΔPOP) is an analogous earlier technique for use on the manually-derived POP, calculated as (POP_{max} − POP_{min})/(POP_{max} + POP_{min})×2.

== History ==
In 1935, German physician Karl Matthes (1905–1962) developed the first two-wavelength ear O_{2} saturation meter with red and green filters (later red and infrared filters). It was the first device to measure O_{2} saturation.

The original oximeter was made by Glenn Allan Millikan in the 1940s. In 1943 and as published in 1949, Earl Wood added a pressure capsule to squeeze blood out of the ear so as to obtain an absolute O_{2} saturation value when blood was readmitted. The concept is similar to today's conventional pulse oximetry, but was difficult to implement because of unstable photocells and light sources; today this method is not used clinically. In 1964 Shaw assembled the first absolute reading ear oximeter, which used eight wavelengths of light.

The first pulse oximeter was developed in 1972 by Japanese bioengineers Takuo Aoyagi and Michio Kishi at Japanese medical electronic equipment manufacturer Nihon Kohden, using the ratio of red to infrared light absorption of pulsating components at the measuring site. Nihon Kohden manufactured the first pulse oximeter, Ear Oximeter OLV-5100. Surgeon Susumu Nakajima and his associates first tested the device in patients, reporting it in 1975. However, Nihon Kohden suspended the development of pulse oximetry and did not apply for a basic patent of pulse oximetry except in Japan, which facilitated further development and utilization of pulse oximetry later in U.S. In 1977, Minolta commercialized the first finger pulse oximeter OXIMET MET-1471. In the U.S., the first pulse oximeter was commercialized by Biox in 1980, followed later by Nellcor in 1983.

By 1987, the standard of care for the administration of a general anesthetic in the U.S. included pulse oximetry. From the operating room, the use of pulse oximetry rapidly spread throughout the hospital, first to recovery rooms, and then to intensive care units. Pulse oximetry was of particular value in the neonatal unit where the patients do not thrive with inadequate oxygenation, but too much oxygen and fluctuations in oxygen concentration can lead to vision impairment or blindness from retinopathy of prematurity (ROP). Furthermore, obtaining an arterial blood gas from a neonatal patient is painful to the patient and a major cause of neonatal anemia. Motion artifact can be a significant limitation to pulse oximetry monitoring, resulting in frequent false alarms and loss of data. This is because during motion and low peripheral perfusion, many pulse oximeters cannot distinguish between pulsating arterial blood and moving venous blood, leading to underestimation of oxygen saturation. Early studies of pulse oximetry performance during subject motion made clear the vulnerabilities of conventional pulse oximetry technologies to motion artifact.

In 1995, Masimo introduced Signal Extraction Technology (SET) that could measure accurately during patient motion and low perfusion by separating the arterial signal from the venous and other signals. Since then, pulse oximetry manufacturers have developed new algorithms to reduce some false alarms during motion, such as extending averaging times or freezing values on the screen, but they do not claim to measure changing conditions during motion and low perfusion. So there are still important differences in performance of pulse oximeters during challenging conditions. Also in 1995, Masimo introduced perfusion index, quantifying the amplitude of the peripheral plethysmograph waveform. Perfusion index has been shown to help clinicians predict illness severity and early adverse respiratory outcomes in neonates, predict low superior vena cava flow in very low birth weight infants, provide an early indicator of sympathectomy after epidural anesthesia, and improve detection of critical congenital heart disease in newborns.

Published papers have compared signal extraction technology to other pulse oximetry technologies and have demonstrated consistently favorable results for signal extraction technology. Signal extraction technology pulse oximetry performance has also been shown to translate into helping clinicians improve patient outcomes. In one study, retinopathy of prematurity (eye damage) was reduced by 58% in very low birth weight neonates at a center using signal extraction technology, while there was no decrease in retinopathy of prematurity at another center with the same clinicians using the same protocol but with non-signal extraction technology. Other studies have shown that signal extraction technology pulse oximetry results in fewer arterial blood gas measurements, faster oxygen weaning time, lower sensor utilization, and lower length of stay. The measure-through motion and low perfusion capabilities it has also allow it to be used in previously unmonitored areas such as the general floor, where false alarms have plagued conventional pulse oximetry. As evidence of this, a landmark study was published in 2010 showing that clinicians at Dartmouth-Hitchcock Medical Center using signal extraction technology pulse oximetry on the general floor were able to decrease rapid response team activations, ICU transfers, and ICU days. In 2020, a follow-up retrospective study at the same institution showed that over ten years of using pulse oximetry with signal extraction technology, coupled with a patient surveillance system, there were zero patient deaths and no patients were harmed by opioid-induced respiratory depression while continuous monitoring was in use.

In 2007, Masimo introduced the first measurement of the pleth variability index (PVI), which multiple clinical studies have shown provides a new method for automatic, noninvasive assessment of a patient's ability to respond to fluid administration. Appropriate fluid levels are vital to reducing postoperative risks and improving patient outcomes: fluid volumes that are too low (under-hydration) or too high (over-hydration) have been shown to decrease wound healing and increase the risk of infection or cardiac complications. Recently, the National Health Service in the United Kingdom and the French Anesthesia and Critical Care Society listed PVI monitoring as part of their suggested strategies for intra-operative fluid management.

In 2011, an expert workgroup recommended newborn screening with pulse oximetry to increase the detection of critical congenital heart disease (CCHD). The CCHD workgroup cited the results of two large, prospective studies of 59,876 subjects that exclusively used signal extraction technology to increase the identification of CCHD with minimal false positives. The CCHD workgroup recommended newborn screening be performed with motion tolerant pulse oximetry that has also been validated in low perfusion conditions. In 2011, the US Secretary of Health and Human Services added pulse oximetry to the recommended uniform screening panel. Before the evidence for screening using signal extraction technology, less than 1% of newborns in the United States were screened. Today, The Newborn Foundation has documented near universal screening in the United States and international screening is rapidly expanding. In 2014, a third large study of 122,738 newborns that also exclusively used signal extraction technology showed similar, positive results as the first two large studies.

High-resolution pulse oximetry (HRPO) has been developed for in-home sleep apnea screening and testing in patients for whom it is impractical to perform polysomnography. It stores and records both pulse rate and SpO_{2} in 1 second intervals and has been shown in one study to help to detect sleep disordered breathing in surgical patients.

== See also ==
- Arterial blood gas – Blood test that measures amounts of dissolved gas
- Capnography – Monitoring of the concentration of carbon dioxide in respiratory gases
- Integrated pulmonary index
- Respiratory monitoring – Method to mechanically assist or replace spontaneous breathing
- Medical equipment – Device to be used for medical purposes
- Mechanical ventilation – Method to mechanically assist or replace spontaneous breathing
- Oxygen sensor – Device for measuring oxygen concentration
- Oxygen saturation – Measure of dissolved or carried oxygen
- Photoplethysmogram – Chart of tissue blood volume changes. Also, the measuring of carbon dioxide (CO_{2}) in the respiratory gases
- Sleep apnea – Disorder involving pauses in breathing during sleep
- CO-oximeter – Oxygen measuring device
