= ENEA AB =

Global information technology company

Enea AB
- Type: Aktiebolag
- Traded as: Nasdaq Stockholm: ENEA
- Industry: Software development
- Founded: Sweden (1968)
- Headquarters: Kista
- Key people: Kjell Duveblad, Chairman of Board; Teemu Salmi, President and CEO
- Products: Software for telecommunication and cybersecurity
- Revenue: 920 million SEK
- Operating income: 122 million SEK
- Net income: 143 million SEK
- Total equity: 1,481 million SEK
- Number of employees: 650
- Website: www.enea.com

Enea AB is an information technology company with its headquarters in Kista, Sweden, that provides real-time operating systems and consulting services. Enea, which is an abbreviation of Engmans Elektronik Aktiebolag, also produces the OSE operating system.

== History ==
Enea was founded 1968 by Rune Engman as Engmans Elektronik AB. Their first product was an operating system for a defence computer used by the Swedish Air Force. During the 1970s the firm developed compiler technology for the Simula programming language.

During the early days of the European Internet-like connections, Enea employee Björn Eriksen connected Sweden to EUnet using UUCP, and registered enea as the first Swedish domain in April 1983. The domain was later converted to the internet domain enea.se when the network was switched over to TCP and the Swedish top domain .se was created in 1986.

== Products ==
=== OSE ===
Operating System Embedded (OSE)
- Developer: Enea AB
- Written in: Assembly, C, C++
- OS family: POSIX file system
- Working state: Current
- Source model: Closed-source
- Initial release: 1985; 41 years ago
- Latest release: OSE Multicore Edition / 22 September 2020; 5 years ago
- Marketing target: Embedded systems
- Available in: English
- Supported platforms: ARM, ColdFire, PowerPC, MIPS
- Kernel type: Microkernel
- Default user interface: Command-line interface
- License: Proprietary
- Official website: www.enea.com

The ENEA OSE real-time operating system first released in 1985.

The Enea multi core family of real-time operating systems was first released in 2009.

The Enea Operating System Embedded (OSE) is a family of real-time, microkernel, embedded operating system created by Bengt Eliasson for ENEA AB, which at the time was collaborating with Ericsson to develop a multi-core system using Assembly, C, and C++. Enea OSE Multicore Edition is based on the same microkernel architecture. The kernel design that combines the advantages of both traditional asymmetric multiprocessing (AMP) and symmetric multiprocessing (SMP). Enea OSE Multicore Edition offers both AMP and SMP processing in a hybrid architecture. OSE supports many processors, mainly 32-bit. These include the ColdFire, ARM, PowerPC, and MIPS based system on a chip (SoC) devices.

The Enea OSE family features three OSs: OSE (also named OSE Delta) for processors by ARM, PowerPC, and MIPS, OSE_{ck} for various DSP's, and OSE Epsilon for minimal devices, written in pure assembly (ARM, ColdFire, C166, M16C, 8051). OSE is a closed-source proprietarily licensed software released on 20 March 2018. OSE uses events (or signals) in the form of messages passed to and from processes in the system. Messages are stored in a queue attached to each process. A link handler mechanism allows signals to be passed between processes on separate machines, over a variety of transports. The OSE signalling mechanism formed the basis of an open-source inter-process kernel design project named LINX.

== Collaborative project and community memberships ==
Enea is a member of various collaborative projects and open source communities:

- Linux Foundation
  - Automotive Grade Linux
  - Linux OPNFV
  - Yocto Project
- Linaro
- Open Data Plane (ODP)
