= ODP =

ODP may refer to:

== Businesses ==
- Office Depot, an office-supply retail chain
- Opening Day Partners, a baseball team owner

== Computing ==
- Observer Design Pattern, a software design pattern
- On Device Portal, a mobile application as service portal or content portal
- Open Directory Project, a Web directory; later renamed to DMOZ
- OpenDocument Presentation, a standard mobile electronic office documents file format with file extension .odp
- OpenDataPlane, a set of application programming interfaces for the networking data plane

== Political parties ==
- Ökologisch-Demokratische Partei (Ecological Democratic Party), a German political party
- Özgürlük ve Dayanışma Partisi (Freedom and Solidarity Party), a Turkish political party
- Oromo Democratic Party, a political party in Ethiopia

== Science, technology and medicine ==
- Ocean Drilling Program, an international research project
- Open drip proof motor
- Operating department practitioner, a perioperative care co-ordinator in UK hospitals
- Ozone depletion potential, in chemistry and pollution

== Other uses ==
- Obstacle departure procedure, IFR standard instrument departure procedures in aviation for obstacle clearance
- Omega Delta Phi, multicultural fraternity founded in the United States in 1987
- Orderly Departure Program, a program to resettle Vietnamese refugees in the United States

== See also ==
- ÖDP (disambiguation)
- RM-ODP, reference model of open distributed processing
