= AllJoyn =

Software

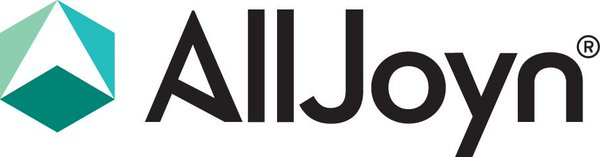
- Developers: Linux Foundation; and Open Connectivity Foundation; (AllSeen Alliance before 2016); (Qualcomm before 2013)
- Release: 21 December 2013; 12 years ago
- Stable release: 16.10 / 1 December 2016; 9 years ago
- Written in: C; C++; Java; Objective-C; JavaScript
- Operating system: Linux, Windows, Mac, FreeRTOS, Android, IOS
- License: Apache 2.0 License
- Website: allseenalliance.org

AllJoyn is an open source software framework that allows compatible devices and applications to find each other, communicate and collaborate across the boundaries of product category, platform, brand, and connection type. Originally the AllSeen Alliance promoted the project, from 2013 until 2016 when the alliance merged with the Open Connectivity Foundation (OCF). In 2018 the source code became hosted by GitHub.

== History ==
The AllJoyn technology was promoted by Qualcomm in 2011. In December 2013, Qualcomm signed over the source code and trademark to the Linux Foundation with the creation of the AllSeen Alliance. The alliance promoted interoperability for the Internet of things, and a number of consumer brands signed on including LG, Sharp Corporation, Haier, Panasonic, Sony, Electrolux, Sears and Arçelik. Other members included Silicon Image, Cisco, TP-Link, Canary, Changhong, Two Bulls, Affinegy, doubleTwist, Fon, Harman, HTC, LIFX, Liteon, Muzzley, Onbiron, Sproutling, Microsoft, and Wilocity

On 10 October 2016, the AllSeen Alliance merged with the Open Connectivity Foundation (OCF). OCF sponsored both the IoTivity and AllJoyn open source projects at the Linux Foundation. The expanded OCF board of directors consisted of executives from Electrolux, Arçelik A.S., ARRIS International plc, CableLabs, Canon, Cisco, GE Digital, Haier, Intel, LG Electronics, Microsoft, Qualcomm, Samsung, and Technicolor SA. Within the merging process, the project's license was changed to the Apache License 2.0.

Source code was located in the AllJoyn project repositories until the end of 2017. In 2018, development ended after the source and documentation were copied to GitHub.

== Technology ==
AllJoyn provided a core system services for interoperability among connected products and software applications across manufacturers to create dynamic proximal networks using a D-Bus message bus. Qualcomm has led development of this open source project, and first presented it at the Mobile World Congress 2011. Unity Technologies has provided the 'AllJoyn Unity Extension' packaged with the AllJoyn SDK release 2.3.6 and above. Original equipment manufacturer and original design manufacturer partners included Foxconn, Technicolor, LG Innotek, LeTV, and Xiaomi.

The AllJoyn software framework and core system services let compatible devices and applications find each other, communicate and collaborate across the boundaries of product category, platform, brand, and connection type. Target devices include those in the fields of Connected Home, Smart TV, Smart Audio, Broadband Gateways, and Automotive. The communication layer (and thus hardware requirements) was limited to Wi-Fi.

The system used the client–server model to organize itself. For example, a light could be a "producer" (server) and a switch a "consumer" (client). Each "producer" on the network has an XML file called introspection that is used to advertise the device's abilities and what it can be asked to do.

It is possible to extend the AllJoyn framework's capabilities by bridging other protocols. Microsoft has added a technology called Device System Bridge that allows devices using home or building protocols such as Z-Wave and BACnet to appear on an AllJoyn network. Microsoft integrated the AllJoyn runtime (standard client) and Router Node service in Windows 10, however, retired it in its successor Windows 11 as of Version 24H2, meaning it will be removed in a future version.

The system had technology for audio streaming to multiple devices sinks in a synchronized way.

AllJoyn provided services that could be integrated with its core, such as onboarding, configuration, notification, and control panel. The Lighting Service Framework (LSF) service was integrated into the common device model service.

== See also ==
- Open Interconnect Consortium, a similar, competing standard
- IoTivity, a similar, collaborating open source project, also sponsored by Open Interconnect Consortium
