= Screen–smart device interaction =

Screen-Smart Device Interaction (SSI) is fairly new technology developed as a sub-branch of Digital Signage.

It differs from the Second screen configuration. The latter typically has the first screen being a big screen and the second screen being the smaller screen of a cellphone. Where the small screen cannot affect or control the big screen. The small screen is often used to provide supplementary data on the content of the big screen. In contrast, SSI is distinguished by the small screen being able to change the flow of information or content on the big screen.

The big screen shows an identifier of its computer network address. Often, the network is the Internet. The identifier might be in a barcode that is part of the image on the big screen. The mobile device scans the barcode, decodes it and queries a server. The server controls the big screen. When the server gets the query, it extracts the identifier of the big screen. The server can alter the mobile device screen and the big screen in a feedback loop.

The user of the mobile device can pick buttons in its web page to change the big screen. The mobile device functions as a remote control. The advantage is the decoupling of specific hardware requirements for the pair of the mobile device and the big screen. If the mobile device is a cellphone, it only needs a camera and wireless Internet access.

If the big screen shows a browser, then there are paired web pages. One for the small screen, one for the big screen. Microsoft calls this the "Companion Web". In general, the pages in the pair are different. The page for the big screen is essentially a digital poster. It does not need any buttons or selectable links. It can have large graphics. The large screen can be assumed to be on a wired connection, giving it large bandwidth. The small screen page is optimised for low bandwidth across a wireless connection.

SSI is gradually becoming a standard for Digital Signage Implementation, seeking to expand the traditional capabilities of this technology, adopting the modern Internet and 'Connected Devices' concepts. It is related to augmented reality and the Internet of Things.

Interactive Digital Signage might be a growth engine for traditional digital signage. Interactive capabilities are gaining increasing attention by retailers, clinics, hotels/restaurants/bars, and other venues that provide service to a 'captive audience'.

Muzzley is a trend in present technology that lets a user in any connected network access the Digital Signage screen using the smartphone. In this scenario, the smartphone keeps adapting its interface according to the experience that the user is having. Muzzley integrates with all the major digital signage manufacturers as well as traditional applications made in standard developing languages as javascript, java, node.js, flash / ActionScript and others.

In general, Screen-Smart device Interaction is a set of mobile, networking, signal processing, software and hardware technologies that allows users with mobile devices (typically cellphones) to connect (using QR, URL or any other novel method) to a public screen and interact, control or acquire its content for emerging applications like effective outdoor advertising, event information distributions, out-of-home gaming, etc. These technologies lets users in any venue use smart mobile devices to answer a poll/survey/quiz, win coupons and even participate in a game.

This Image is a schematic description of SSI implementation:

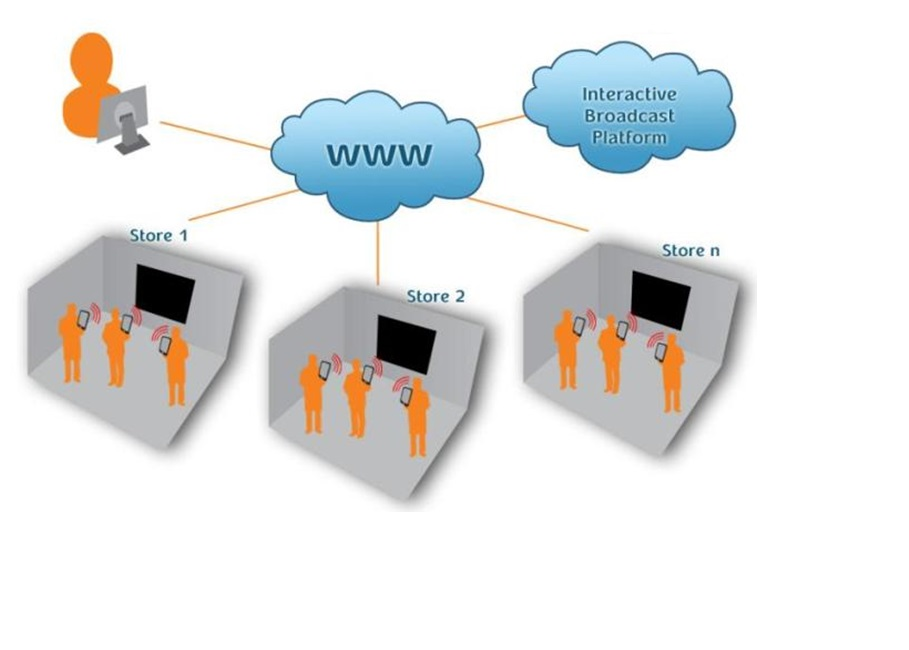
SSI 1
