= LF Energy =

Electricity sector technology

- Formation: 2018
- Founder: Shuli Goodman
- Founded at: San Francisco, California, United States
- Type: 501(c)(6) organization
- Location: San Francisco, California, United States
- Parent organization: Linux Foundation
- Website: www.lfenergy.org

Linux Foundation Energy (known as LF Energy) is an initiative launched by the US-based Linux Foundation in 2018 to improve the power grid. Its aim is to spur the uptake of digital technologies within the electricity sector and adjoining sectors using open source software and practices, with a key application being the smarter grid.

== History ==
LF Energy was formed in 2018. The organization was founded by Shuli Goodman, who served as its executive director. RTE supported the creation of LF Energy since early 2018 and became its first Strategic Member. LF Energy is an umbrella organization that includes energy companies such as Alliander and RTE. Energy company executives such as Arjan Stam (Director of System Operations at Alliander) and Lucian Balea (Director of Open Source) have joined LF Energy as governing board members. LF Energy helped develop Alliander's open source program offices after Alliander joined the organization in 2019.

The organization formally launched in May 2019.

LF Energy launched the open industrial IoT platform GXF (Grid eXchange Fabric) in collaboration with Alliander in February 2020.

LF Energy partnered with GE Renewable Energy, Schneider Electric, National Grid, and RTE (Réseau de Transport d'Électricité) to launch the Digital Substation Automation Systems (DSAS) initiative and the related Configuration Modules for Power Industry Automation Systems (CoMPAS) project in 2020. The DSAS initiative aims to use open-source technology to convert electrical substations into digital substations to accelerate progress towards achieving carbon neutrality. In like manner, CoMPAS provided software modules for automation systems in the power industry.

In 2020, LF Energy launched the second DSAS open-source project SEAPATH, which provided a platform for virtualized automation for power grids and substations.

In 2021, LF Energy collaborated with Sony Computer Science Laboratory on the microgrid initiative Hyphae, which aims to automate peer-to-peer renewable energy distribution. The organization also introduced the SOGNO software initially funded by the European Commission Horizon 2020 programs. Its focus is on grid automation using microservices and control rooms.

Microsoft partnered with LF Energy as part of its 100/100/0 program in September 2021.

Google joined LF Energy as a Strategic Member as part of its 24/7 Carbon Free Energy initiative in early 2022.

In early 2022, LF Energy launched the EVerest project, which aims to provide open source software for the electric vehicle charging infrastructure. LF Energy was also one of the organizations that took part in the Carbon Call, an initiative aimed at developing reliable measurement and accounting of carbon emissions.

Shell joined LF Energy as a Strategic member in 2022.

Shuli Goodman died on 3 January 2023.

The Power Grid Model project, which originated at Alliander, became a part of LF Energy in May 2023. Power Grid Model is a high-performance Python/C++ library for steady-state distribution power system analysis. The project provides benefits to utilities in the areas of short term real-time state estimation and forecasting, long term grid planning, and congestion management.

In December 2023, LF Energy launched several new open source energy systems projects including CitrineOS (a community-tested and reliable open source software for charger management which drives forward adoption of the OCPP 2.0.1 protocol resulting in more reliable charging networks worldwide originated by S44 Energy), TROLIE (contributed by GE Vernova and MISO to establish an open conformance standard and cultivate a software ecosystem to accelerate the implementation of reliable, secure, and interoperable systems for the exchange of transmission facility ratings and related information), and the Battery Data Alliance (created by AmpLabs to bring battery companies together to work jointly to unify how batteries are handled in terms of software).

Alex Thornton was appointed the new Executive Director of LF Energy in December 2023.

LF Energy and the U.S. Joint Office of Energy and Transportation partnered in January 2024 to build an open source reference implementation for electric vehicle (EV) charging infrastructure leveraging LF Energy’s EVerest project to develop and maintain an open source software stack for energy communications across charging stations, vehicles, generation resources, batteries, adjacent chargers, power grids, backend payment systems, user interfaces, and mobile devices.

Hydro-Quebec, the largest power utility in Canada, joined LF Energy as a General Member in May 2024 and upgraded to a Strategic Member in 2025.

In 2024, the Centre for Net Zero contributed the OpenSynth project to LF Energy, which aims to empower holders of raw smart meter data around the world to generate and share synthetic data, and for community members to generate, improve and share algorithms.

In December 2024, LF Energy with support from Southern California Edison (SCE), created the Grid Edge Interoperability & Security Alliance (GEISA), which creates a production-grade, secure technical foundation for a robust and open grid edge “app” ecosystem in constrained edge devices. SCE became the first US investor-owned utility to join LF Energy officially in 2025.

== Governing board ==
- Lucan Balea (Strategic Member Representative & Board Chair)
- Arjan Stam (Strategic Member Representative & Board Treasurer)
- Antonello Monti (Technical Advisory Council Chair)
- Savannah Goodman (Strategic Member Representative - Google)
- Laurent Boinot (Strategic Member Representative - Microsoft)
- Naresh Kumar Gajendran (Strategic Member Representative - Shell)
- Marco Moller (General Member Representative - Pionix)
- Christophe Villemer (General Member Representative - Savoir-faire Linux)
