= Nectar Inc. =

Nectar, Inc.
- Company type: Private
- Industry: Medical device
- Founded: 1992
- Founder: Darren Saravis
- Headquarters: Long Beach, Southern California
- Website: https://www.nectarpd.com/

Nectar, Inc. is an American company that develops medical devices. It is headquartered in Long Beach, California, USA.

== History ==
The company was founded in 1992 by Darren Saravis, a known figure in the medical device industry. Saravis has a background in design and engineering and has developed various projects for the company, including the BDR-19 Critical-Care Ventilator that received emergency use authorization during the Covid-19 pandemic in 2020. He is also the CEO of Nectar and has founded other companies, like BreathDirect and X-Naut.

Nectar received the IDEA award from BusinessWeek for devices it designed for Belkin International in 2002 and 2007. It again received an award from IDEA in 2012 for developing Pure Rain, a brand for oxygenating watering systems with a nano bubble generator, for Bluemark Industries. In 2019, Nectar became an ISO 13485:2016 certified company. In the same year, it was named a Top Product Design Firm by Clutch.co, a leading B2B ratings and reviews platform. The company has also been recognized for its workplace culture, including being named a Best Place to Work by the Los Angeles Business Journal.

In 2023, the company partnered with the California State University, Long Beach (CSULB).

=== Notable products ===
- Seca Medical Scale - medical scales that enable the user interface to be mounted on either side of the measuring rod.
- Smardii - a connected smart diaper that detects wetness and soiling, reads body temperature, location, and positioning, and performs real-time urine analysis.
- Limb Lengthener – a non-invasive limb lengthener device consisting of an intramedullary nail, locking screws, and reusable instruments, controlled by an External Remote Controller (ERC).
- Releef Initiative’s Drug Dispenser, a specialized medicine dispenser for use in poor and third world countries. This pro bono effort in conjunction with the Releef Initiative was covered in an article in the Long Beach Press-Telegram.
- The Elemental Line of Kitchen Products, a collaboration with SinoGlass.
- Collaborated with medical manufacturer Benechill on its new Rhinochill system, which induces therapeutic hypothermia during emergencies.
- The Desktop Factory 3-D Printer, according to Nectar's website, a "3-dimensional printer with a footprint of 25 x 20 and stands 20 inches tall that weighs less than 90 pounds."
