= Linux Foundation =

Non-profit technology consortium to develop the Linux operating system

The Linux Foundation
- Predecessor: Open Source Development Labs; Free Standards Group
- Formation: 2000; 26 years ago
- Type: 501(c)(6) organization
- Purpose: Open-source software
- Headquarters: 2810 N Church St, PMB 57274 Wilmington, DE 19802-4447, United States
- Members: 1,000+ corporate members
- Employees: 150
- Website: www.linuxfoundation.org

The Linux Foundation (LF) is a nonprofit organization formed in 2007 to support the development of Linux and open-source software. The foundation provides hosted projects with governance structures and shared legal and operational services.

Originally focused primarily on Linux, the foundation has expanded into an umbrella organization for open-source projects and foundations across areas including cloud computing, artificial intelligence, software security, networking, and embedded systems. Its ecosystem includes the Cloud Native Computing Foundation (CNCF), which hosts Kubernetes; the PyTorch Foundation; and the Open Source Security Foundation (OpenSSF).

== History ==
The Linux Foundation started as the Free Standards Group and Open Source Development Labs in 2000 to standardize and promote the open-source operating system kernel Linux. They merged in 2007. The foundation has since evolved to promote open-source projects beyond the Linux OS as a "foundation of foundations" that hosts a variety of projects spanning topics such as cloud, networking, blockchain, and hardware. The foundation also hosts annual educational events among the Linux community, including the Linux Kernel Developers Summit and the Open Source Summit.

== Foundations and projects ==
Linux Foundation is the umbrella organization for a variety of foundations and projects. As of September 2015, the total economic value of the development costs of Linux Foundation Collaborative Projects was estimated at $5 billion. By 2025, Linux Foundation was the umbrella organization for over 1,000 open source projects and communities.

Name	Description
AllJoyn	AllJoyn is an open-source software framework that allows compatible devices and applications to find each other, communicate, and collaborate across the boundaries of product category, platform, brand, and connection type.
Automotive Grade Linux	Automotive Grade Linux is a collaborative open-source project developing a Linux-based, open platform for the connected car that can serve as the de facto standard for the industry. Although initially focused on In-Vehicle Infotainment (IVI), the AGL roadmap includes instrument clusters, heads-up displays, telematics, and autonomous driving. The goals of AGL are to provide: An automotive-focused core Linux operating system stack that meets common and shared requirements of the automotive ecosystem; A transparent, collaborative, and open environment for Automotive OEMs, Tier One suppliers, and their semiconductor and software vendors to create in-vehicle software; A collective voice for working with other open-source projects and developing new open-source solutions; An embedded Linux distribution that enables rapid prototyping for developers new to Linux or teams with prior open source experience
Carrier Grade Linux	Carrier Grade Linux is a set of specifications that detail standards of availability, scalability, manageability, and service response characteristics which must be met for Linux kernel-based operating system to be considered carrier grade.
Cloud Foundry	Cloud Foundry is an open-source, multi-cloud application platform as a service governed by the Cloud Foundry Foundation.
Cloud Native Computing Foundation	The Cloud Native Computing Foundation was founded in 2015 to help advance container technology and align the tech industry around its evolution.
Continuous Delivery Foundation	The Continuous Delivery Foundation is an open-source community improving the world's ability to deliver software with security and speed.
Core Infrastructure Initiative	The Core Infrastructure Initiative was announced on 25 April 2014 in the wake of the Heartbleed security vulnerability to fund and support free and open-source software projects that are critical to the functioning of the Internet.
Data Plane Development Kit	The Data Plane Development Kit provides a set of libraries and network interface controller polling-mode drivers to accelerate CPU architecture-running packet processing workloads.
DocumentDB	DocumentDB is a document database built on top of PostgresSQL and is fully compatible MongoDB. It provides a native implementation of a document-oriented NoSQL database.
EdgeX Foundry	EdgeX Foundry is a vendor-neutral open-source platform providing a common framework for industrial IoT edge computing.
FinOps Foundation	The FinOps Foundation is dedicated to advancing people who practice the discipline of cloud financial management through best practices, education, and standards.
FRRouting	FRRouting is an IP routing protocol suite for Unix and Linux platforms.
goose	goose is an open-source AI agent framework originally developed by Block and contributed to the Linux Foundation's Agentic AI Foundation. It supports multiple language-model providers and extensions using the Model Context Protocol.
IoTivity	The IoTivity is an open-source framework created to standardize inter-device connections for the IoT.
ITAM Forum	ITAM Forum is a trade and standards body to the IT Asset Management industry
JanusGraph	JanusGraph is an open-source, graph database supporting global graph data analytics, reporting, and ETL.
LF AI & Data Foundation	The LF AI & Data Foundation supports 75 open-source projects in artificial intelligence, machine learning, deep learning, and data open-source projects.
LF Decentralized Trust	Umbrella project launched in October of 2024 that encompasses the Hyperledger ecosystem, Trust Over IP community, and new projects.
Linux Standard Base	The Linux Standard Base was a joint project by several Linux distributions to standardize the software system structure.
Lura	Lura is an open-source API gateway project hosted by the Linux Foundation. Originally developed as KrakenD, the project was rebranded as Lura when it joined the Linux Foundation in 2021. It focuses on building high-performance, extensible API gateways for modern architectures.
Model Context Protocol (MCP)	MCP is an open-source protocol for AI models to share data with external tools, systems, and data sources, introduced by Anthropic in November 2024, and contributed to the Linux Foundation's Agentic AI Foundation in December 2025.
Neo4j	Neo4j joined the project in 2025 to contribute to the development of open-source AI based on knowledge graphs.
ONOS	Open Network Operating System is an open-source community to brings software-defined networking to communications service providers to make networks more agile for mobile and data center applications.
OpenAPI Specification	OpenAPI Specification is a specification for a machine-readable interface definition language for describing, producing, consuming and visualizing web services.
OpenBMC	The OpenBMC project is a collaborative open-source project whose goal is to produce an open-source implementation of the Baseboard Management Controllers (BMC) Firmware Stack.
OpenChain	The OpenChain Project aims to define effective open-source software compliance in software supply chains. A key output is the ISO/IEC 5230 standard.
Open Container Initiative	In 2015, Docker & CoreOS launched the Open Container Initiative in partnership with The Linux Foundation to create a set of industry standards in the open around container formats and runtime.
OpenDaylight Project	The OpenDaylight project is an open-source platform for Software-Defined Networking (SDN) that uses open protocols to provide centralized, programmatic control and network device monitoring. It aims to accelerate the adoption of SDN and Network Functions Virtualization in service providers, enterprises, and research networks.
OpenJS Foundation	OpenJS Foundation hosts projects and funds activities to support the long-term sustainability of the JavaScript and web ecosystem as a whole.
OpenSearch Software Foundation	The OpenSearch Software Foundation funds activities to support OpenSearch, an open source search and analytics suite that eases ingestion, search, visualization, and analyzing data
Open Source Security Foundation	The Open Source Security Foundation (OpenSSF) works towards a collaborative effort to improve the security of the open-source software ecosystem.
Open Mainframe Project	The Open Mainframe Project is a Collaborative Project to encourage the use of Linux-based operating systems and open-source software on mainframe computers.
Open Model Initiative	The Open Model Initiative is a community-led project hosted by LF AI & Data Foundation that promotes the development and adoption of openly licensed generative AI models, particularly for image, video, and audio generation.
OpenPrinting	develops Internet Printing Protocol (IPP) based printing technology for Linux- and Unix-based operating systems
Open vSwitch	Originally created at Nicira before moving to VMware (and eventually the Linux Foundation), OvS is an open source virtual switch supporting standard management interfaces and protocols.
ONAP	The Open Network Automation Platform is the result of OPEN-O and Open ECOMP projects merging in April 2017. The platform allows end users to design, manage, and automate services and virtual functions.
OpenTofu	Initially known as OpenTF, OpenTofu is a software project for infrastructure as code born as a fork of Terraform as part of a response from opensource community and companies after licensing changes in Terraform. It was eventually admitted as a Linux Foundation project under his current name.
OPNFV	The Open Platform for Network Function Virtualization (NFV) "aims to be a carrier-grade, integrated platform that introduces new products and services to the industry more quickly." In 2016, the project began an internship program, created a working group and an "End User Advisory Group"
Overture Maps Foundation	In mid-December 2022, the foundation announced the launch of a new mapping collaboration, the Overture Maps Foundation. Its founding members were Amazon Web Services (AWS), Meta, Microsoft and TomTom. It is intended to be complementary to the crowdsourced OpenStreetMap (OSM) project and the foundation encourages members to contribute data directly to OSM.
PyTorch Foundation	The PyTorch Foundation Originally incubated by Meta’s AI team, PyTorch has grown to include a massive community of contributors and users under their community-focused stewardship.
React	Originally created by Meta (formerly Facebook) React is a front-end JavaScript library that aims to make building user interfaces based on components more seamless.
RethinkDB	After RethinkDB announced its shutdown as a business, the Linux Foundation announced that it had purchased the intellectual property under its Cloud Native Computing Foundation project, which was then relicensed under the Apache License (ASLv2). RethinkDB describes itself as "the first open-source, scalable JSON database built from the ground up for the realtime web."
RISC-V	The RISC-V International association is chartered to standardize and promote the open RISC-V instruction set architecture together with its hardware and software ecosystem for use in all computing devices.
seL4	seL4 is the only microkernel in existence which has been developed using formal verification techniques. It belongs to the L4 microkernel family and was, like the other L4 microkernels, designed to attain great security and performance.
Software Package Data Exchange	The Software Package Data Exchange (SPDX) project was started in 2010, to create a standard format for communicating the components, licenses, and copyrights associated with software packages. As part of the project, there is a team that curates the SPDX License List, which defines a list of identifiers for commonly found licenses and exceptions used for open source and other collaborative software.
Tizen	Tizen is a free and open-source, standards-based software platform supported by leading mobile operators, device manufacturers, and silicon suppliers for multiple device categories such as smartphones, tablets, netbooks, in-vehicle infotainment devices, and smart TVs.
TLA+	The TLA+ Foundation manages the development of TLA+. TLA+ is a formal specification language for modeling programs and systems, especially concurrent and distributed ones.
Tokenomics Foundation	It is responsible for establishing open, vendor-neutral industry standards and best practices for the AI economy. But it also analyzes the costs of AI to link its use to business value and outcomes.
Valkey	Valkey is an open-source in-memory key–value database, used as a distributed cache and message broker, with optional durability. It holds all data in memory and offers low-latency reads and writes. It started as a fork of Redis after licensing changes.
vLLM	vLLM is an open-source library for high-throughput large language model inference and serving. Originally developed at the University of California, Berkeley's Sky Computing Lab, the project later entered the LF AI & Data Foundation to support open governance and community-led development.
Xen Project	The Xen Project team is a global open-source community that develops the Xen Hypervisor, and contributes to the Linux PVOPS framework, the Xen® Cloud Platform, and Xen® ARM.
Yocto Project	The Yocto Project is an open source collaboration project that provides templates, tools and methods to help create custom Linux-based systems for embedded products regardless of the hardware architecture. It was founded in 2010 as a collaboration among many hardware manufacturers, open-source operating systems vendors, and electronics companies to bring some order to the chaos of embedded Linux development.
Zephyr Project	Zephyr is a small real-time operating system for connected, resource-constrained devices supporting multiple architectures. It was developed as an open-source collaboration project and released under the Apache License 2.0. Zephyr became a project of the Linux Foundation in February 2016.

== Community stewardship ==
For the Linux kernel community, the Linux Foundation hosts its IT infrastructure and organizes conferences such as the Linux Kernel Summit and the Linux Plumbers Conference. It also hosts a Technical Advisory Board made up of Linux kernel developers. One of these developers has been appointed to sit on the Linux Foundation board.

=== Conferences ===
The Linux Plumbers Conference has been held annually since 2008. It focuses on the Linux kernel and related tools and libraries, typically lasts 3 days, and was held in the USA primarily for USA-based developers in its early years, but now is regularly held elsewhere in the world.

Linux Plumbers Conference
Year	Location	Dates	Website
2008	Portland	September 17-19	https://blog.linuxplumbersconf.org/2008
2009	Portland	September 23-25	https://blog.linuxplumbersconf.org/2009
2010	Cambridge	November 3-5	https://blog.linuxplumbersconf.org/2010
2011	Santa Rosa	September 7-9	https://blog.linuxplumbersconf.org/2011
2012	San Diego	August 29-31	https://blog.linuxplumbersconf.org/2012
2013	New Orleans	September 18-20	https://blog.linuxplumbersconf.org/2013
2014	Düsseldorf	October 15-17	https://blog.linuxplumbersconf.org/2014
2015	Seattle	August 19-21	https://blog.linuxplumbersconf.org/2015
2016	Santa Fe	November 1-4	https://blog.linuxplumbersconf.org/2016
2017	Los Angeles	September 13-15	https://blog.linuxplumbersconf.org/2017
2018	Vancouver	November 13-15	https://lpc.events/event/2
2019	Lisbon	September 9-11	https://lpc.events/event/4
2020	Virtual/Online	September 1-3	https://lpc.events/event/10
2021	Virtual/Online	September 20-24	https://lpc.events/event/11
2022	Dublin	September 12-14	https://lpc.events/event/16
2023	Richmond	November 13-15	https://lpc.events/event/17
2024	Vienna	September 18-20	https://lpc.events/event/18
2025	Tokyo	December 11-13	https://lpc.events/event/19
2026	Prague	October 5-7	https://lpc.events/event/20

=== Goodwill partnership ===
In January 2016, the Linux Foundation announced a partnership with Goodwill Central Texas to help hundreds of disadvantaged individuals from underserved communities and a variety of backgrounds get the training they need to start careers in Linux IT.

=== Community Specification ===
In July 2020, the Linux Foundation announced an initiative allowing open-source communities to create Open Standards using tools and methods inspired by open-source developers.

=== Core Infrastructure Initiative ===
The Core Infrastructure Initiative (CII), is a project managed by the Linux Foundation that enables technology companies, industry stakeholders, and esteemed developers to collaboratively identify and fund critical open-source projects in need of assistance. In June 2015, the organization announced financial support of nearly $500,000 for three new projects to better support critical security elements of the global information infrastructure. In May 2016, CII launched its Best Practice Badge program to raise awareness of development processes and project governance steps that will help projects have better security outcomes. In May 2017, CII issued its 100th badge to a passing project.

=== Community Data License Agreement (CDLA) ===
Introduced in October 2017, the Community Data License Agreement (CDLA) is a legal framework for sharing data. There are two initial CDLA licenses:

- The CDLA-Sharing license was designed to embody the principles of copyleft in a data license. It puts terms in place to ensure that downstream recipients can use and modify that data, and are also required to share their changes to the data.
- The CDLA-Permissive agreement is similar to permissive open source licenses in that the publisher of data allows anyone to use, modify, and do what they want with the data with no obligations to share changes or modifications.

=== Linux.com ===
On March 3, 2009, the Linux Foundation announced that they would take over the management of Linux.com from its previous owners, SourceForge, Inc.

The site was relaunched on May 13, 2009, shifting away from its previous incarnation as a news site to become a central source for Linux tutorials, information, software, documentation, and answers across the server, desktop/netbook, mobile, and embedded areas. It also includes a directory of Linux software and hardware.

Much like Linux itself, Linux.com plans to rely on the community to create and drive content and conversation.

=== Linux Foundation Public Health (LFPH) ===
In 2020 amidst the COVID-19 pandemic, the Linux Foundation announced the LFPH, a program dedicated to advancing and supporting the virus contact tracing work led by Google and Apple and their Bluetooth notification systems. The LFPH is focusing its efforts on public health applications, including the effort's first initiative: a notification app intended for governments wanting to launch their privacy-focused exposure notification networks. As of today, LFPH hosts two contact-tracing apps.

=== LF Climate Finance Foundation ===
In September 2020, The Linux Foundation announced the LF Climate Finance Foundation (LFCF), a new initiative "to encourage investment in AI-enhanced open source analytics to address climate change." LFCF plans to build a platform that will utilize open-source open data to help the financial investment, NGO, and academia sectors to help better model companies’ exposure to climate change. Allianz, Amazon, Microsoft, and S&P Global will be the initiative's founding members.

=== LF Energy ===
LF Energy is an initiative launched by the Linux Foundation in 2018 to improve the power grid.

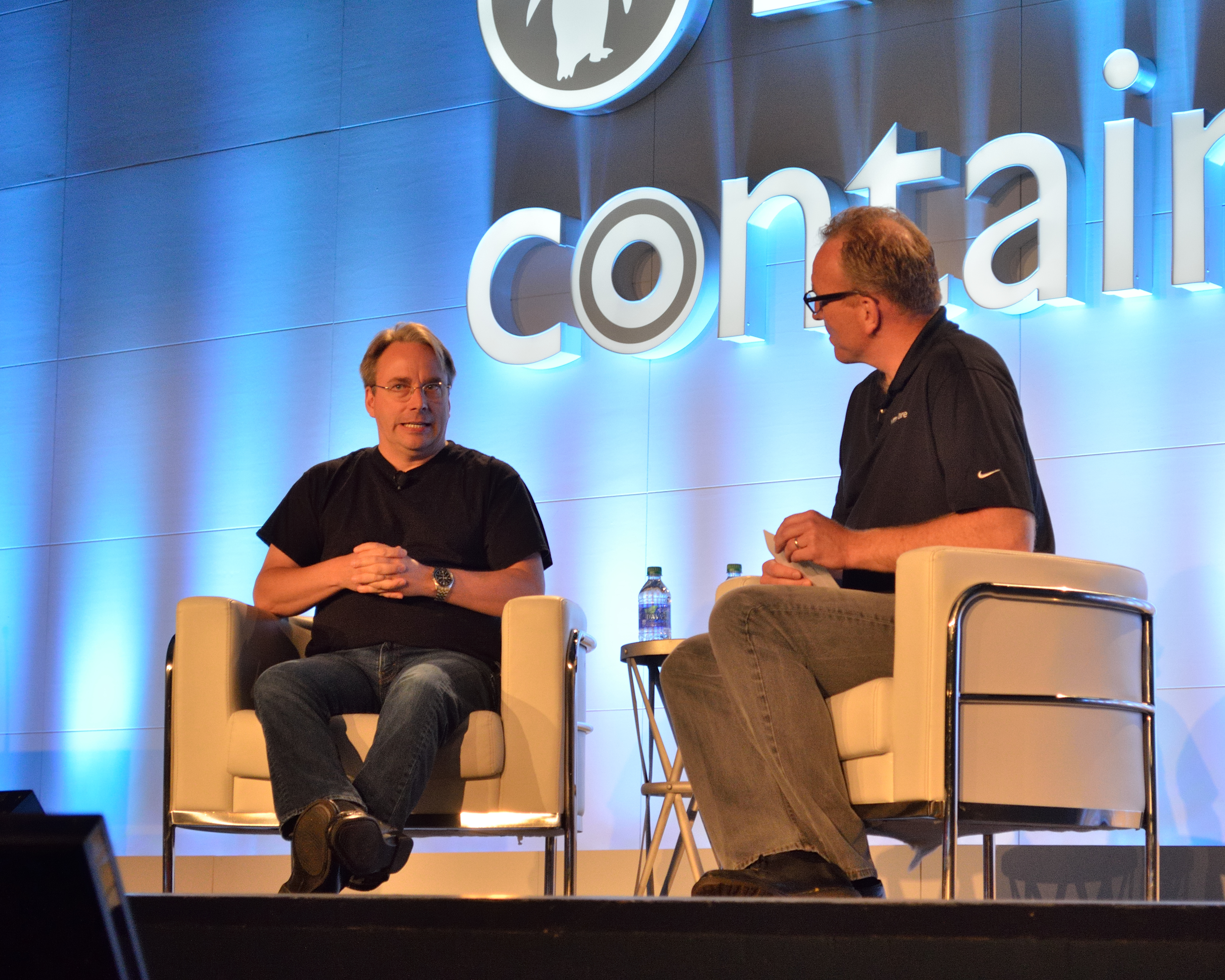
Linus Torvalds at LinuxCon North America 2016

=== Training and certification ===
The Linux Foundation Training Program features instructors and content from the leaders of the Linux developer and open-source communities.

Participants receive Linux training that is vendor-neutral and created with oversight from leaders of the Linux development community. The Linux Foundation's online and in-person training programs aim to deliver broad, foundational knowledge and networking opportunities.

In March 2014, the Linux Foundation and edX partnered to offer a free, massive open online class titled Introduction to Linux. This was the first in a series of ongoing free offerings from both organizations whose current catalogue of MOOCs include Intro to DevOps, Intro to Cloud Foundry and Cloud Native Software Architecture, Intro to Apache Hadoop, Intro to Cloud Infrastructure Technologies, and Intro to OpenStack.

In December 2015, the Linux Foundation introduced a self-paced course designed to help prepare administrators for the OpenStack Foundation's Certified OpenStack Administrator exam.

==== LFCS - Linux Foundation Certified System Administrator ====
As part of a partnership with Microsoft, it was announced in December 2015 that the Linux on Azure certification would be awarded to individuals who pass both the Microsoft Exam 70-533 (Implementing Microsoft Azure Infrastructure Solutions) and the Linux Foundation Certified System Administrator (LFCS) exam.

In early 2017, at the annual Open Source Leadership Summit, it was announced that the Linux Foundation would begin offering an Inclusive Speaker Orientation course in partnership with the National Center for Women & Information Technology. The course is designed to give participants "practical skills to promote inclusivity in their presentations."

In September 2020, the Linux Foundation released a free serverless computing training course with CNCF. It is taught by Alex Ellis, founder of OpenFaaS.

Among many other organizations with similar offerings, The Linux Foundation has reported a 40% increase in demand for their online courses in 2020 during the coronavirus pandemic and the resulting social-distancing measures.

=== Patent Commons Project ===
The patent commons consists of all patented software which has been made available to the open source community. For software to be considered to be in the commons the patent owner must guarantee that developers will not be sued for infringement, though there may be some restrictions on the use of the patented code. The concept was first given substance by Red Hat in 2001 when it published its Patent Promise.

The Patent Commons Project was launched on November 15, 2005, by the Open Source Development Labs (OSDL). The core of the project is an online patent commons reference library aggregating and documenting information about patent-related pledges and other legal solutions directed at the open-source software community. As of 2015, the project listed 53 patents.

=== Open Compliance Program ===
The Linux Foundation's Open Compliance Program provides an array of programs for open-source software licensing compliance. The focus of this initiative is to educate and assist developers (and their companies) on licensing requirements, to make it easier to create new software. The program consists primarily of self-administered training modules, but it is also meant to include automated tools to help programmatically identify license compliance issues.

=== Agentic AI Foundation ===
In December 2025, it was announced that the Linux Foundation will create the Agentic AI Foundation (AAIF) to host and ensure the open-source, interoperability of AI agents and having an organized product ecosystem. To establish the group, Anthropic is donating its Model Context Protocol (MCP), Block is donating goose (an open source agent framework), and OpenAI is donating AGENTS.md (instructions that are added to code repositories instructing AI coding tools on how to act). Other organizations that are joining the foundation include: Amazon Web Services (AWS), Bloomberg, Cloudflare, and Google.

== Funding ==
Funding for the Linux Foundation comes primarily from its Platinum Members, who pay US$500,000 per year according to Schedule A in LF's bylaws, adding up to US$7.5 million. The Gold Members contribute a combined total of US$1.2 million and Silver members contribute between US$5,000 and US$20,000 based on the amount of employees, summing up to at least US$6,240,000.

In December 2023, the Open Networking Foundation (ONF), including its LF Broadband, Aether and P4 projects, merged with Linux Foundation. As part of the merger, ONF handed over $5 million in funding. As of June 2024, the foundation collected annual fees worth at least US$14,940,000.

=== Use of donations ===
By early 2018, the Linux Foundation's website stated that it "uses [donations] in part to help fund the infrastructure and fellows (like Linus Torvalds) who help develop the Linux kernel."

== Sub-organizations ==
=== Linux Foundation Europe ===
The Linux Foundation established the Linux Foundation Europe, with its headquarter located in Brussels, on September 14, 2022, with the aim of promoting open source throughout Europe. Linux Foundation Europe will increase open collaborative activities for all European stakeholders, including citizens, the public sector, and the private sector. Among the first members of the Linux Foundation Europe are Ericsson, Accenture, Alliander, Avast, Bosch, BTP, esatus AG, NXP Semiconductors, RTE, SAP, SUSE S.A., TomTom, Bank of England, OpenForum Europe, OpenUK, and the Research Institutes of Sweden. The Linux Foundation Europe will make it possible for open collaborative projects to be housed on European soil. The first initiative is the Open Wallet Foundation (OWF), which aims to create an interoperable engine for digital wallets that supports payment processing, identity verification, and storing verified credentials including employment, education, financial status, and entitlements was launched on 23 February 2023. The inaugural members are Accenture, Gen Digital, Futurewei Technologies, Visa Inc., American Express, Deutsche Telekom / T-Systems, esatus AG, Fynbos, Hopae, IAMX, IDnow, IndyKite, Intesi Group, Ping Identity, Digital Identification and Authentication Council of Canada (DIACC), Digital Dollar Project, Digital Identity New Zealand (DINZ), Digital Identity and Data Sovereignty Association (DIDAS), DizmeID Foundation (DIZME), Hyperledger Foundation, Information Technologies and Telematics Institute / Centre for Research and Technology Hellas (CERTH/ITI), Johannes Kepler University Linz, ID2020, IDunion SCE, Mifos Initiative, MIT Connection Science, Modular Open Source Identity Platform (MOSIP), OpenID Foundation, Open Identity Exchange (OIX), Secure Identity Alliance (SIA), University of Rovira i Virgili, and the Trust Over IP Foundation (ToIP).

The Linux Foundation Europe started the RISC-V Software Ecosystem (RISE) initiative on May 31, 2023. The goal of RISE is to increase the availability of software for high-performance and power-efficient RISC-V processors running high-level operating systems for a range of market segments by bringing together a large number of hardware and software vendors. Red Hat, Samsung, Qualcomm, Nvidia, MediaTek, Intel, and Google are among the initial members.

Linux Foundation Europe organisation took over governance of open source Rust-based Servo browser engine project from Mozilla in 2020, then rebooted with Igalia in 2023. Other projects include open source mobile cross platform framework, Open Mobile Hub as a middleware for cross platform mobile app interoperability across multiple mobile platforms launched in 2023.

=== Linux Foundation India ===
During KubeCon + CloudNativeCon India in New Delhi, the Linux Foundation announced the opening of Linux Foundation India on 11 December 2024, which will work on subjects including blockchain, security, Edge/IoT, cloud native technologies, telecommunications, and domain-specific artificial intelligence. In India, the need for open-source technology has increased by 42% in 2023 as a result of the Linux Foundation's partnership with the International Startup Foundation (ISF). They are also collaborating with the open source networking company OpenNets. Through the LF Decentralized Trust, the Reserve Bank of India (RBI) and the Ministry of Electronics and Information Technology (MEITy) are utilizing Linux Foundation's projects to build the National Blockchain Framework and Digital Rupee. The Linux Foundation India will launch projects that will be introduced straight upstream into the Linux Foundation further facilitating ongoing technological collaborations between the Federal Government of the United States and the Government of India, in contrast to the Linux Foundation Europe and Linux Foundation Japan, which focus on region-specific open source projects because of governmental constraints. Linux Foundation India will provide open source contributors to the Linux Foundation's sub-organizations.

== See also ==
- Contributor Covenant - code of conduct intended to ensure a safe and harassment-free environment for minorities.
