= COBOL Cowboys =

American software consulting company

COBOL Cowboys is a Gainesville, Texas software consulting company founded by Bill and Eileen Hinshaw in 2013. It was named after the Clint Eastwood movie Space Cowboys, in reference to bringing subject matter experts out of retirement. The company specializes in updating legacy COBOL code on mainframe computers, often found in the back office of banks, other long-lived companies, and government agencies. The youngest coders at the firm are usually in their 50s.

During the COVID-19 pandemic in the United States, founder Bill Hinshaw said that part of the problem faced by state unemployment systems strained by the pandemic was that the COBOL software used by the systems was run on older hardware: "New machinery is 64-bit with multiple processors or brains. So that if one processor gets overloaded, it starts sharing the work with another processor down the line." Hinshaw compared the modernization of mainframe COBOL to "hopping off of your bicycle and jumping onto a Harley Davidson motorcycle".

== See also ==
- Open Mainframe Project
- Year 2000 problem
- COBOL § Legacy
