= ONAP =

Open Network Automation Platform
- Initial release: November 20, 2017
- Stable release: Jakarta (10.0.0) / June 30, 2022
- Repository: https://gerrit.onap.org/r/admin/repos
- License: Apache 2.0
- Website: https://onap.org

ONAP (Open Network Automation Platform) is an open-source, orchestration and automation framework. It is hosted by The Linux Foundation.

== History ==
On February 23, 2017, ONAP was announced as a result of a merger of the OpenECOMP and Open-Orchestrator (Open-O) projects. The goal of the project is to develop a widely used platform for orchestrating and automating physical and virtual network elements, with full lifecycle management.

ONAP was formed as a merger of OpenECOMP, the open source version of AT&T's ECOMP project, and the Open-Orchestrator project, a project begun under the aegis of the Linux Foundation with China Mobile, Huawei and ZTE as lead contributors. The merger brought together both sets of source code and their developer communities, who then elaborated a common architecture for the new project.

The first release of the combined ONAP architecture, code named "Amsterdam", was announced on November 20, 2017. The next release ("Beijing") was released on June 12, 2018.

As of January, 2018, ONAP became a project within the LF Networking Fund, which consolidated membership across multiple projects into a common governance structure. Most ONAP members became members of the new LF Networking fund.

== Overview ==
ONAP provides a platform for real-time, policy-driven orchestration and automation of physical and virtual network functions that will enable software, network, IT and cloud providers and developers to rapidly automate new services and support complete lifecycle management.

ONAP incorporates or collaborates with other open-source projects, including OpenDaylight, FD.io, OPNFV and others.

Contributing organizations include AT&T, Samsung, Nokia, Ericsson, Orange, Huawei, Intel, IBM and more.

== Architecture ==
ONAP Architecture
| Design | Orchestration & Management | Operations |
|---|---|---|
| Design-Time Framework: Service Design and Creation (SDC); Policy | Run-Time Framework: Active and Available Inventory (AAI); Controllers; Dashboard; Data Collection, Analytics and Events (DCAE); Master Service Orchestrator (MSO); ONAP Optimization Framework (OOF); Security Framework | ONAP Operations Manager (OOM) |
