= Open Mainframe Project =

- Formation: 17 August 2015; 11 years ago
- Type: Open-source software project
- Purpose: encourage use of Linux-based operating systems and open-source software on mainframe computers
- Parent organization: Linux Foundation
- Website: openmainframeproject.org

Open Mainframe Project is a Linux Foundation project to encourage use of Linux-based operating systems and open-source software on mainframe computers. The project was announced on 17 August 2015, and was driven by IBM, a major supplier of mainframe hardware, as well as 16 other founding members, that included SUSE, CA Technologies, BMC Software, Compuware as well as clients and partners such as RSM Partner, Vicom Infinity, L3C LLP and ADP, and academic institutions such as Marist College and University of Bedfordshire. At the same time, IBM announced a partnership with Canonical to make the Ubuntu operating system available for its high-end z Systems hardware.

Development priorities for the project in 2016 include OpenJDK, Docker, and Hyperledger.

In February 2016 the Linux Foundation announced new members had joined the Open Mainframe Project: Hitachi Data Systems, Sine Nomine Associates, East Carolina University, and DataKinetics, a 35% expansion in the overall membership. Canonical, the organization behind Ubuntu, has also joined. Part of the announcement was the launch of a summer intern program.

== Projects ==
=== Zowe ===
Zowe is the first open source project for z/OS. It was announced in August 2018 at SHARE in St. Louis together with the open beta release of version 0.9 that contained contributions from IBM, Computer Associates, and Rocket Software. Version 1.0 was released in February 2019. In September 2019 Phoenix Software International obtained Zowe conformance for their (E)JES Command Line Interface plug-ins and Representational State Transfer (REST) API extension.

z/OS may be used through a command-line interface, a "Zowe Explorer" Visual Studio extension, a web browser served from the Zowe Application Framework, or through REST APIs and web sockets served through the API Mediation Layer. Zowe may be extended through CLI plug-ins, new applications to be added to the web desktop, and onboarding of REST APIs to the API Mediation Layer.

The Zowe conformance program provides certification accreditation to independent software vendors (ISVs) and systems integrators (SIs) building and distributing Zowe extensions.

== See also ==
- Linux on IBM Z
