= Open Source Security Foundation =

Industry forum on software security

- Abbreviation: OpenSSF
- Predecessor: Core Infrastructure Initiative
- Formation: 2020; 6 years ago
- Type: Nonprofit
- Purpose: Consolidating industry efforts to improve the security of open source software
- Location: San Francisco, United States
- Region served: Worldwide
- Members: 116
- General Manager: Steve Fernandez
- Parent organization: Linux Foundation
- Website: openssf.org

The Open Source Security Foundation (OpenSSF) is a cross-industry forum for collaborative improvement of open-source software security. Part of the Linux Foundation, the OpenSSF works on various technical and educational initiatives to improve the security of the open-source software ecosystem.

== History ==
The OpenSSF was formed in August 2020 as the successor to the Core Infrastructure Initiative, another Linux Foundation project.

In October 2021, Brian Behlendorf was announced as the OpenSSF's first full-time general manager. In May 2023, OpenSSF announced Omkhar Arasaratnam as its new general manager, and Behlendorf became CTO of the organization.

== Activity ==
=== Working groups and projects ===
The OpenSSF houses various initiatives under its 10 current working groups. The OpenSSF also houses two projects: the code signing and verification service Sigstore and Alpha-Omega, a large-scale effort to improve software supply chain security.

=== Policy ===
The White House held a meeting on software security with government and private sector stakeholders on January 13, 2022. In May 2022, the OpenSSF hosted a follow-up meeting, the Open Source Software Security Summit II, where participants from industry agreed on a 10-point Open Source Software Security Mobilization Plan, which received $30 million in funding commitments. In August 2023, the OpenSSF served as an advisor for DARPA's AI Cyber Challenge (AIxCC), a competition around innovation around AI and cybersecurity. In September 2023, the OpenSSF hosted the Secure Open Source Software Summit with the White House, where government agencies and companies discussed security challenges and initiatives around open source software.

== See also ==
- Computer security
- Open Security Foundation
