= Open Source University Meetup =

The Open Source University Meet-Up was a student developer organization sponsored by Sun Microsystems that educated its members about open-source technologies through technical demonstrations, access to web courses, and discounts on Sun Certification.

== History ==
Sun started the Open Source University Meet-Up as part of its program to help connect students in computer science to its technologies. Typically led by a campus ambassador or on-campus volunteer, Open Source University Meet-Ups exist in many countries.

== Purpose ==
The Open Source University Meet-Up was a place for Sun to connect student developers to Sun’s wide array of open source software platforms, following Sun’s initiatives to open-source all of its software technologies. As a whole it also helped give software developers, students, and other interested people an opportunity to learn more about open source software.

== See also ==
- MSDN Academic Alliance
