= Open Connectivity Foundation =

Internet of Things industry organisation

- Abbreviation: OCF
- Formation: February 19, 2016; 10 years ago
- Type: Standards organization
- Purpose: Promoting standards for the Internet of things
- Members: Many member organizations
- Website: openconnectivity.org

The Open Connectivity Foundation (OCF) is an industry organization to develop standards, promote a set of interoperability guidelines, and provide a certification program for devices involved in the Internet of things (IoT). By 2016 it claimed to be one of the biggest industrial connectivity standards organizations for IoT. Its membership includes Samsung Electronics, Intel, Microsoft, Qualcomm and Electrolux.

The OCF delivers a framework that enables these requirements via a specification, a reference implementation and a certification program. IoTivity, the open source reference implementation of the specifications, is actively developed by different members of the OCF.

== History ==
The Open Interconnect Consortium (OIC) began as an industry group to develop standards and certification for devices involved in the Internet of Things (IoT) based around the Constrained Application Protocol (CoAP). OIC was created in July 2014 by Intel, Broadcom, and Samsung Electronics. Broadcom left the consortium shortly after it was established, due to a disagreement on how to handle intellectual property.

In September 2015 a release candidate of the specification in version 1.0 for the core framework, smart home device, resource type, security and remote access capabilities was released. By November, 2015, "diamond members" included Cisco Systems, GE Software, Intel and Samsung.

On February 19, 2016 the OIC changed its name to the Open Connectivity Foundation and added Microsoft, Qualcomm and Electrolux.

In November 2018 it was announced version 1 of the standard was ratified by International Organization for Standardization as ISO/IEC 30118-1:2018.

In November, 2019, OCF released a draft "cloud API" for cloud computing services in addition to device-to-device and device-to-cloud service specifications.

By 2021, "diamond members" were Haier, LG Corporation and Samsung.

== See also ==
- IoTivity, an open source reference implementation for the OCF specifications
- AllJoyn, a similar, collaborating open source framework, also sponsored by OCF
- Constrained Application Protocol (CoAP)
- Universal Plug and Play (UPnP), networking protocols for networked devices to discover and establish functional network services
