= Coraline Ada Ehmke =

Software developer and open source advocate

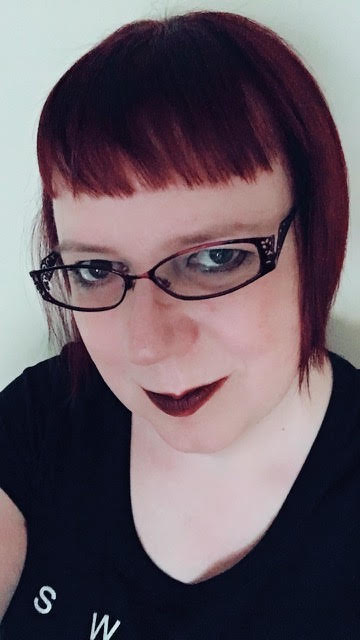
- Coraline Ada Ehmke
- Occupations: Technologist, software engineer, speaker, writer
- Known for: ethics, advocacy
- Notable work: Culture Offset, Contributor Covenant, Post-Meritocracy Manifesto
- Website: where.coraline.codes

Coraline Ada Ehmke is an American software developer, open source advocate, Founder and Executive Director of the Organization for Ethical Source. She is the author of We Just Build Hammers: Stories from the Past, Present, and Future of Responsible Tech, published by Apress in 2025.

Currently based in Chicago, Illinois, Ehmke began her career as a web developer in 1994 and has worked in a variety of industries, including engineering, consulting, education, advertising, healthcare, and software development infrastructure. She is known for her work in Ruby, and in 2016 earned the Ruby Hero award at RailsConf, a conference for Ruby on Rails developers. She is also known for her social justice work and activism, writing the Contributor Covenant and Post-Meritocracy Manifesto, and promoting the widespread adoption of codes of conduct for open source projects and communities.

== Career ==
Ehmke began writing software in 1994, using the Perl programming language. She has since written software in ASP.NET and Java, before discovering Ruby in 2007. She is the author of 23 Ruby gems and has contributed to projects including Rspec and Ruby on Rails. She has spoken frequently at software conferences, and she has given keynote addresses at multiple technology conferences worldwide, including RubyFuza in Cape Town, South Africa and RubyConf Brazil.

In 2013 at the Madison+ Ruby conference, Ehmke was among a group of people who announced the creation of a community for LGBT technologists called LGBTech. During this announcement, she also came out publicly as transgender.

In 2014, Ehmke created OS4W.org, a website to help women contribute to open source by connecting them with mentors and pair programming partners, and identifying open source projects that welcome diverse contributors.

Also in 2014, she created the Contributor Covenant, a code of conduct used in over 40,000 open source projects including all such projects from Google, Microsoft, and Apple. In 2016, she received a Ruby Hero award in recognition of her work on the Contributor Covenant. After allegations of sexual harassment were made against the founder and CEO of GitHub and his wife in March 2014, Ehmke joined Betsy Haibel to create a service called the Culture Offset. Culture Offset allowed people who wished to boycott GitHub but were unable to do so because it was necessary for their work to "offset" their use by directing donations to organizations working to help underrepresented people in the technology industry. This project was featured in the Wall Street Journal and Wired Magazine. Ehmke is also the author of the Post-Meritocracy Manifesto.

Ehmke was a founding panelist on the Greater Than Code podcast. She served on the boards of directors for Ruby Together and RailsBridge.

In 2016, she joined GitHub as a senior developer on a team that develops community management and anti-harassment features for the software platform. She was fired approximately a year later, and on July 5, 2017 published an article criticizing GitHub's culture and the circumstances surrounding her severance. Her story was featured in a 2017 report on hush clauses and non-disparagement agreements published by CNN.

In 2018 Ehmke participated in a debate at the United Nations Forum on Business and Human Rights in Geneva, Switzerland on the topic of tech companies being a threat to human rights. Ehmke created the "Hippocratic License" (described as "An Ethical License for Open Source Projects") and in 2020 founded the Organization for Ethical Source.

Ehmke has been the repeated subject of negative reporting by far-right organizations and bloggers including Breitbart News, and has described herself as a "Notorious Social Justice Warrior" after being given the moniker in a Breitbart article about her joining GitHub.

== Personal life ==
Ehmke is transgender, and began her transition in March 2014. She has been public about her transition in hopes of helping others, and has given several interviews about her experiences transitioning and working as a trans woman in technology. She has also given a talk about her experiences titled "He Doesn't Work Here Anymore" at the Keep Ruby Weird, Alterconf, and Madison+ Ruby conferences.

Ehmke writes and records music and has released several albums under the name A Little Fire Scarecrow. and Sudre’s Violin.

== See also ==
- Sage Sharp
- Valerie Aurora
