= Muzzley =

Muzzley Corp.
- Company type: Private
- Available in: English
- Headquarters: San Francisco
- Founders: Domingos Bruges; Eduardo Pinheiro
- Industry: Product Development
- Employees: 18
- Website: www.muzzley.com
- Registration: Required
- Launched: May 2012
- Current status: Active
- Native clients on: iOS, Android, Windows 10

Muzzley is an app to control Internet of Things devices. The app, available for iOS, Android and Windows 10 allows to control these devices. They provide third party devices integrations through their API's and SDK's for manufacturers to directly embed into their microcontrollers.

== History ==
Muzzley was founded in March 2012 by Domingos Bruges and Eduardo Pinheiro.

Later that year, they started beta testing and raised their first round of seed investment.

In 2013, the Muzzley team moved to the United States. They also expanded their team and partnered with Intel.

In February 2014, Muzzley received $2.5m in Seed venture capital funding, led by Portugal Ventures. The investment was also backed by Espírito Santo Ventures and Plug and Play Tech Center.

They also nominated Jon Castor as the Chair of the Board and released the second major release of the app, Muzzley V2.0.

On May 1, 2018, Habit Analytics acquired Muzzley for an undisclosed amount.

== Compatible Devices ==
- Belkin Wemo Switch
- Belkin Wemo Insight Switch
- Belkin Wemo Light Switch
- Belkin Wemo LED Light Bulbs
- Belkin Wemo Maker
- Phillips Hue
- D-Link Cameras
- Trax GPS Tracker
- Tractive GPS Tracker
- Netatmo Weather Station
- Koubachi Plant Care
- GreenIQ Smart Garden Hub
- Withings
- CrockPot Smart Slow Cooker
- Misfit Fitness Trackers
- Mr. Coffee Smart Coffee Maker
- Nest Learning Thermostat
- Nest Protect
- ecobee3
- Automatic
- Mojio
- Egardia
- Chamberlain MyQ
- Connected by TCP
- Rachio Iro
- Insteon
- Milight
- Easybulb
- Futlight
- Qblinks Qmote
