= JWT =

JWT may refer to:

- JSON Web Token, a metadata standard
- JWt (Java web toolkit), a software library
- J. Walter Thompson, an advertising agency

See also:

- James Webb Space Telescope (JWST)
