= Open Source Program Office =

Department in an organization

An Open Source Program Office (OSPO) is a department of subject-matter experts involved in free and open source software within an organization, such as a company, university, or government agency. This team may oversee the implementation and use of open standards and digital public goods. It often includes staff with expertise in related legal compliance and risk management issues. OSPOs can support culture change in an organization toward using or developing more open source software.

== Implementations ==
Companies that have OSPOs include Yahoo!, Goldman Sachs, Bloomberg L.P., Comcast, and Porsche. Universities with OSPOs include Trinity College Dublin, the University of Vermont, and Johns Hopkins University. CERN launched its OSPO in 2023. The U.S. federal government agency Centers for Medicare & Medicaid Services has also established an OSPO to help them improve organizational effectiveness.

The Linux Foundation has projects that support people developing or maintaining OSPOs, TODO Group and Community Health Analytics in Open Source Software (CHAOSS). There is also an OSPO community for those working in university and research institution OSPOs, called CURIOSS.

== Responsibilities ==
The tasks of an OSPO include business oriented goals:

- Advocacy for free software within the organization
- Internal and external community management and support of the respective maintainer of the software projects
- Development of business models for open-source software
- Corporate communication to the open source strategy inside and outside the organization and contact with other OSPOs

OSPOs also handle technical and legal compliance issues, such as:

- Technical support of projects
- Maintenance of public and private repositories on GitHub and GitLab for version control.
- Release for use of free software
- Documentation of dependencies in used or included free software to prevent vulnerability or software license violations from third-party software.
- Creation and monitoring of license compliance policies of free-software licenses in deployed applications or published products
