= ÖDP =

ÖDP may refer to:

- Özgürlük ve Dayanışma Partisi, Turkey
- Ökologisch-Demokratische Partei, Germany
