= IoTivity =

- Original author(s): Open Connectivity Foundation
- Initial release: December 18, 2015; 9 years ago
- Stable release: 2.0 / 2018
- Repository: github.com/iotivity/iotivity-lite
- Written in: C, C++, Java (programming language)
- Operating system: Linux; Tizen; Android; Windows; iOS
- License: Apache License 2.0
- Website: iotivity.org

The IoTivity is an open source framework created to standardize inter-device connections for the IoT. Any individual or company can contribute to the project, and this may influence OCF standards indirectly. However, being a member of the OCF can benefit from patent cross-licensing protection.

The IoTivity architectural goal is to create a new standard by which billions of wired and wireless devices will connect to each other and to the Internet.

== History ==
In October 2016 they announced AllJoyn merger into Iotivity. The group hoped that devices running either AllJoyn or Iotivity would be interoperable and backward compatible.

On October 10, 2016, the AllSeen Alliance merged with the Open Connectivity Foundation (OCF) under the OCF name and bylaws. OCF then sponsored both the IoTivity and AllJoyn open source projects. The merged groups announced that they will collaborate on future OCF specifications, as well as the IoTivity and AllJoyn open source projects, and current devices running on either AllJoyn or IoTivity will be interoperable and backward-compatible. The expanded OCF board of directors included: Electrolux, Arçelik A.S., ARRIS International plc, CableLabs, Canon, Cisco, GE Digital, Haier, Intel, LG Electronics, Microsoft, Qualcomm, Samsung, and Technicolor SA.

The release is 2.0 was announced in September, 2018. Previously, there was a 1.3.1 release for the IoTivity Framework. Within the merging process with AllJoyn, the software license changed to Apache 2.0 Licence which makes it easier to other open source projects to include IoTivity and AllJoyn in more projects.

The system uses the Constrained Application Protocol (CoAP) as its application layer which can uses several underlying physical layers as long as the network layer is Internet Protocol. Examples include: Wi-Fi, Ethernet, Bluetooth low energy, Thread, and Z-Wave.

Legacy protocols are also supported by a protocol plugin manager including:

- ANT+
- Zigbee
- Bluetooth low energy (GATT)

== Features ==
- Discovery - the ability for a given device to find other devices around it as well as offering its own services to them
- Data Transmission - the ability to pass messages between devices in a standardised way
- Device management
- Data management

== See also ==
- Open Connectivity Foundation: On February 19, 2016 the OIC changed its name to the Open Connectivity Foundation
- Open Interconnect Consortium
- Constrained Application Protocol: The core protocol that IoTivity is built on
- AllJoyn, a similar, collaborating open source project, also sponsored by Open Interconnect Consortium
