= WEMO =

Home automation company

Belkin WeMo
- Product type: Home automation
- Current owner: Belkin

WEMO, a subsidiary of Belkin, are a series of products from Belkin that enable users to control home electronics remotely. The product suite includes electrical plugs, motion sensors, light switches, cameras, light bulbs, and a mobile app.

== Products ==
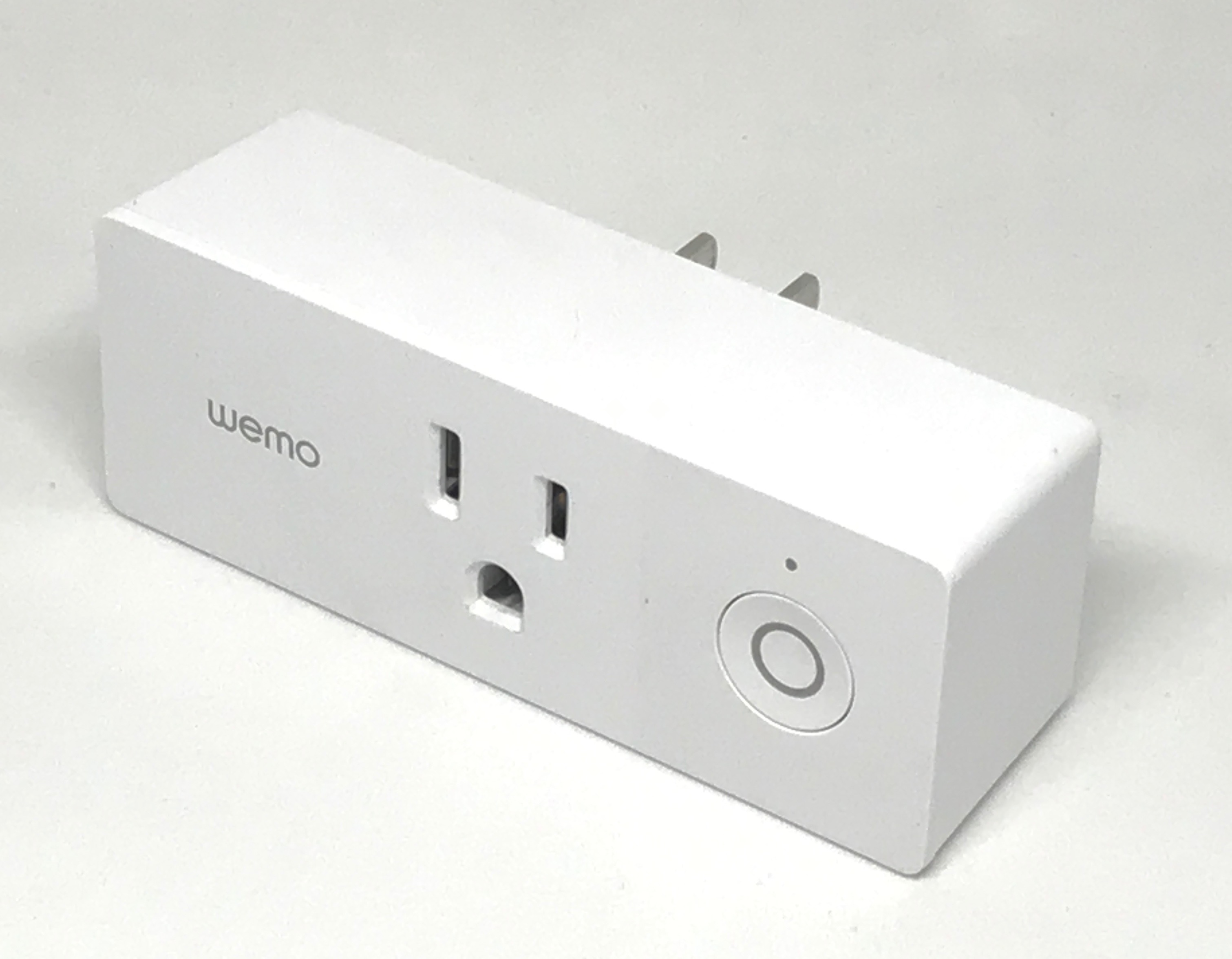
A Wemo mini smart plug

The Wemo Switch can be plugged into any home outlet, which can then be controlled from an iOS or Android smartphone running the Wemo App, via home Wi-Fi or mobile phone network.

The Wemo Motion Sensor can be placed anywhere, as long as it can access the same Wi-Fi network as the Wemo devices it is intended to control. It can then turn on and off any of the Wemo devices connected to the Wi‑Fi network as people pass by.

The Wemo Insight Switch provides information on power usage and cost estimation for devices plugged into the switch.

The Wemo Light Switch is for use where a light is controlled by a single light switch. Multi-way switching is not supported at this time but can be approximated by installing a Wemo Light Switch at each location.

The Wemo App controls the Wemo devices from anywhere in the world as long as the Wemo devices' wireless network is connected to the Internet. Wemo devices can also be controlled using IFTTT technology. Wemo devices can also be controlled by voice through the Amazon Echo, Google Assistant, and Apple's Siri (through the use of the Wemo Bridge).

== Remote security vulnerability ==
Wemo switches are controlled via IP networks; thus, for a switch to be controllable from a remote location, it must be open to receive connections from the Internet. In January 2013, it was revealed that the Wemo had a security flaw in its UPnP implementation that allowed an unauthorized user to take control of a switch. This could allow malicious attacks, such as flipping the switch at a very fast rate, which could damage certain devices and even cause electrical fires.

This vulnerability has been addressed by updated firmware releases.

== Discontinuation of support ==
On July 10, 2025, Belkin announced its decision to end technical support for older Wemo products, effective January 31, 2026. After this date, several Wemo products will no longer be controllable through the Wemo app. Any features that rely on cloud connectivity, including remote access and voice assistant integrations, will no longer work.
