= Contributor Covenant =

Code of conduct for contributors to free and open source software projects

The Contributor Covenant is a code of conduct for contributors to free/open source software projects, created by Coraline Ada Ehmke. Its stated purpose is to reduce harassment of minority, LGBT and otherwise underrepresented open source software developers.

The Contributor Covenant is used in prominent projects including Linux, Swift, Go, and JRuby. Relevant signers include Google, Apple, Microsoft, Intel, Eclipse and GitLab.

Since its initial release as an open source document in 2014, its creator has claimed it has been adopted by over 100,000 open source projects. In 2016 GitHub added a feature to streamline the addition of the Contributor Covenant to an open source project and the Ruby library manager Bundler also has an option to add the Contributor Covenant to software programs that its users create.

In 2016, Ehmke received a Ruby Hero award in recognition of her work on the Contributor Covenant.

Following the adoption of the Contributor Covenant v1.4 by Linux in 2018 the Linux community reacted, with some applauding the change and some speaking against it.

In 2021 the Contributor Covenant has been folded into the Organization for Ethical Source which promotes the idea that "software freedom must be always in service of human freedom".

== See also ==
- Ada Initiative
- Inclusive language
- Outreachy
- Women in computing
