= Belkin =

American consumer electronics and networking company

Belkin International, Inc.

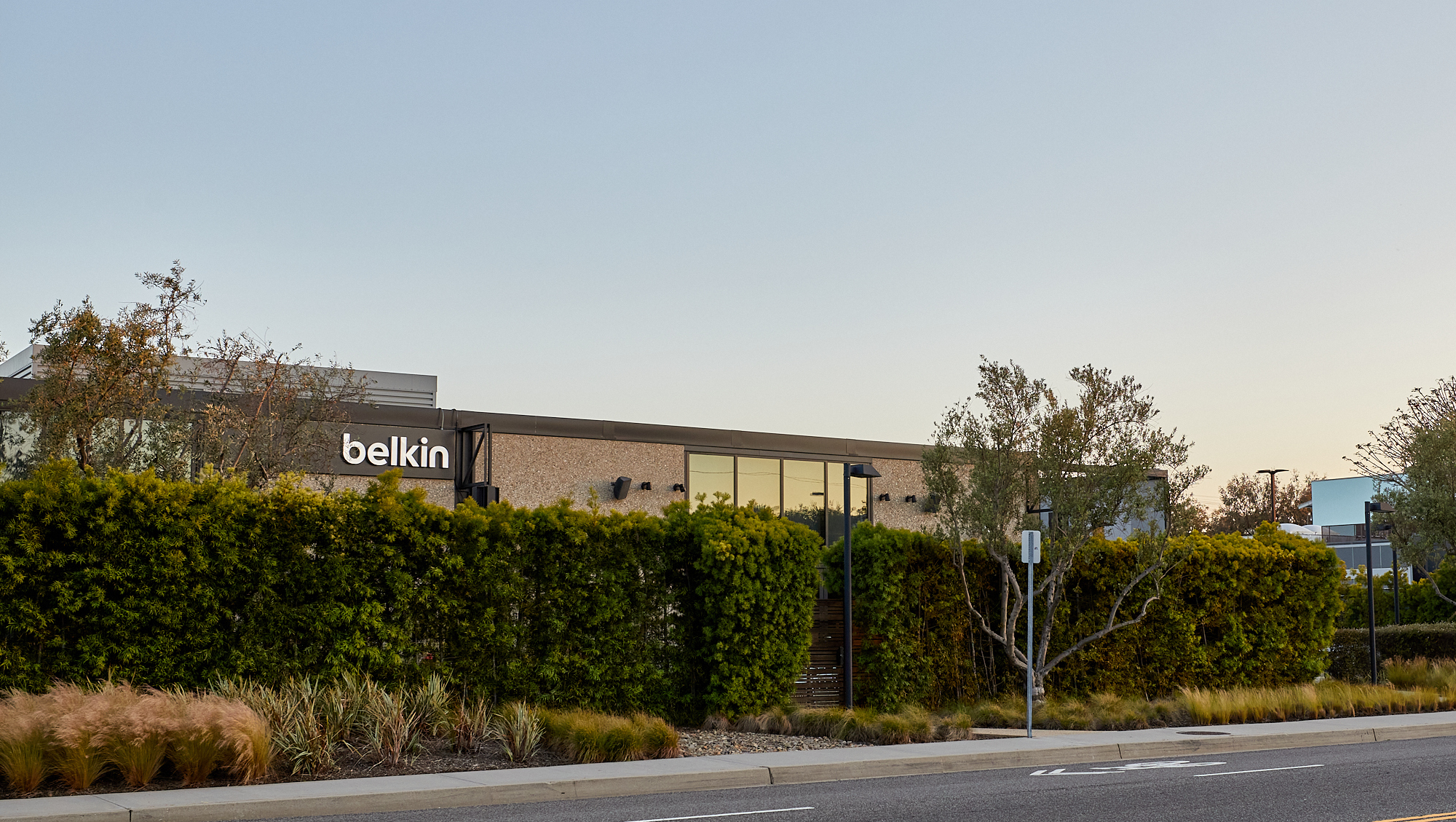
- Trade name: Belkin (Note: The name is stylized in lowercase in the logo.)
- Type: Subsidiary
- Industry: Consumer electronics
- Founded: April 18, 1983; 43 years ago
- Founder: Chet Pipkin
- Headquarters: El Segundo, California, U.S.
- Key people: Chet Pipkin (chairman); Steve Malony (CEO)
- Number of employees: 1000+
- Parent: Foxconn Interconnect Technology
- Website: www.belkin.com

Belkin International, Inc., is an American consumer electronics company headquartered in El Segundo, California. It produces mobile and computer connectivity devices and peripherals for consumer and commercial use. These include wireless chargers, power banks, charging cables, data cables, audio and video adapters, headphones, earbuds, screen protectors and cases, surge protectors, docking stations and data hubs, secure KVM switches and network cables.

== History ==
While attending UCLA, Chet Pipkin, who was spending his time in local computer shops, saw the growing need for cables that would connect personal computers to new printers being released for home use. In the early 1980s, Chet Pipkin founded Belkin in his parents' home in Hawthorne, California, to manufacture computer cables for the new personal computer and tech accessory market. Pipkin began to sell computer-to-printer cables to local computer shops. As Pipkin's cable connector sales grew in Southern California, he recruited assembly help from his machinist father, brother, and a handful of friends. In 1982, Pipkin left his university studies to focus on expanding the business.

On January 1, 1983, Pipkin moved into a professional workplace and hired his first full-time employees. Belkin performed its cable manufacturing in the United States, which gave the company a fast turnaround for customers. In 1985, in addition to U.S. manufacturing, Belkin began contracting Asian factories to increase production for a global market. In the 1990s, Belkin added surge protectors and USB storage devices to its product line. In the early 2000s, Belkin expanded its product line to accommodate smartphone and tablet users with hardware accessories including chargers and connector cables.

In 2012, Belkin launched the WeMo brand to produce smart home products. In March 2013, Belkin acquired Cisco Systems' Home Networking Business Unit, including the Linksys brand and product line. By 2015 the company had 1,350 employees and sales of more than $1 billion. In 2016, Belkin, in a joint venture with water solutions company Uponor, formed Phyn, a home water management tech brand. In September 2018, Belkin was purchased by Foxconn Interconnect Technology, a Taiwanese multinational electronics firm and the largest provider of electronics manufacturing services, for $866 million. Belkin now operates as an independent subsidiary, and the Linksys business is a separate subsidiary of Foxconn Interconnect Technology and Fortinet.

In January 2021, Pipkin stepped down from his role as CEO of Belkin to become the Executive Chairman of the Board. Senior Vice President and General Manager Steve Malony was announced as the new CEO.

== Corporate affairs ==
Belkin is headquartered in El Segundo, California. Previously, the head offices were in the neighboring southern California cities of Playa Vista, Hawthorne, and Compton. The company has offices in Australia, China, France, Germany, Hong Kong, Korea, Netherlands, New Zealand, Singapore, Taiwan, United Arab Emirates, United Kingdom, and the United States.

From its founding in 1983 until 2012, the Belkin logo was simply the name Belkin. In 2009, Belkin pledged to reduce 25 percent of the company's worldwide electricity consumption by 2017, and by 2018, Belkin had 37 percent reduction worldwide. Belkin made efficiency upgrades, including solar panels, EV charging stations in company parking lots, and motion sensor lighting in offices and distribution centers. In 2024, Belkin announced an aim to be 100 percent carbon neutral across its business by 2030.

=== Brands ===
In 2013, Belkin purchased Linksys, a Cisco network hardware company that specializes in wireless connectivity. As of 2021, the Linksys business is now a subsidiary of Foxconn Interconnect Technology and Fortinet.

In 2016, Phyn, a home water management tech brand, was created by Belkin in a joint venture with water solutions company Uponor. In 2021, Uponor sold its stake in the venture to Belkin.

In February 2024, Belkin introduced Future Ventures, a product category focused on content creation, spatial computing, artificial intelligence, and robotics.

=== Donations and outreach ===
Between May 2013 and the end of the 2014 season, Belkin sponsored a Dutch professional cycling team, Belkin Pro Cycling Team. Belkin stepped in after the team formerly known as Rabobank lost their headline sponsor.

Belkin is involved in the local Compton community through the ASAP (Advanced Surveillance and Protection Plan) program with the LASD (LA County Sheriff's Department) and the Everybody Wins reading program. Belkin supports Susan G. Komen for the Cure to fight breast cancer through its pink ribbon iPod cases that have helped raise $350,000 for the organization. In 2007, Belkin made a holiday donation to the One Laptop per Child (OLPC) initiative.

Belkin is a founding partner and an industry partner with Da Vinci Schools, a network of charter schools with the goal of "hands-on learning," to prepare students for college and careers. In 2015, Belkin began the Belkin Internship program for the Da Vinci Extension program in which Da Vinci students gain career experiences in their community.

== Products ==
Belkin markets a range of cables for electronic devices, including charging cables, data cables, audio/video cables, cable adapters, and network cables.

At its 1983 founding, Belkin focused on cables and connectors for printers and modems. In 1984 its Hamlet cable was the first to connect the Apple IIc computer's serial port to Centronics port printers. In the 1990s it prioritized surge protectors and USB-based products. In 2008, Belkin pivoted toward smartphone usage and designed new products for the smartphone accessory market.

Belkin produced its first stereo cables and speaker wiring in 2002. It markets audio products that are compatible with new technology and devices, including digital audio adapters, speakers and headphones. At CES 2019, Belkin announced the company's first headphones line, RockStar, for iPhone and Android devices. The first of the line provided headphones that are attachable to an iPhone Lightning port. In 2020, Belkin released the Soundform True Wireless Earbuds and its first speaker, the Soundform Elite Hi-Fi Smart Speaker. The Soundform Elite was created in partnership with Devialet. The speaker was named Best Smart Speaker on Rolling Stone's Top Product Essentials of 2020. In 2023, Belkin announced the SoundForm Inspire headphones and the SoundForm Adapt headphones. With the SoundForm Inspire, Belkin sourced feedback from children to engineer a design specifically suited to kids. Both headsets include wireless Bluetooth and USB-C connectivity.

Belkin also sells wall chargers, car chargers, charging stations, power banks, surge protectors, power strips, and wireless chargers for smartphones, tablets, smartwatches, laptops, computers, and other electronic devices. In 2016, Belkin released an iPhone-compatible adapter for simultaneous iPhone charging and headphone use.

Belkin produced the world's first third-party MagSafe accessory. In 2023, Belkin launched the BoostCharge Pro 3-in-1 Wireless Charging Pad with Qi2 and the BoostCharge Convertible Qi2 Wireless pad to stand. Smart circuitry detects the connected device for charging, while universal charging protocols such as USB-C, MagSafe, and Qi2 offer widespread compatibility. With Qi2, supported iPhones will be able to charge at up to 15W without Apple's specific MagSafe charging equipment.

Belkin produces secure KVM switches government-regulated certifications, designed to protect government and private enterprise data.

Belkin also produces device protection products under the Screenforce name. In 2023, the UltraGlass 2 was made available for sale.

Future Venture launched its first products in 2024, the Auto-Tracking Stand Pro, and the Battery Holder for Apple Vision Pro.
