= Organization for Ethical Source =

Non-profit organization for support for the ethical source movement

- Abbreviation: OES
- Formation: December 2020; 5 years ago
- Type: non-profit organization
- Purpose: Educational
- Headquarters: Switzerland
- Region served: Worldwide
- Members: Individuals
- Leader: Coraline Ada Ehmke
- Website: ethicalsource.dev

The Organization for Ethical Source (OES) is a non-profit organization founded by Coraline Ada Ehmke in December 2020, to support the ethical source movement, which promotes that "software freedom must always be in service of human freedom". The organization is dedicated to "giving technologists tools and resources to ensure that their work is being used for social good and to minimize harm". It develops tools to "promote fair, ethical, and pro-social outcomes for those who contribute to, or are affected by, open source technologies".

The organization aims to support the ethical source movement, promoting ethics and social responsibility in open source. The movement has facilitated a new kind of license, the Hippocratic License, inspired by the medical Hippocratic Oath. The license has been criticized as non-enforceable and non-open source, including by Bruce Perens, co-founder of the Open Source Initiative and author of the Open Source Definition. The license has triggered debate within the open source movement. The Hippocratic License has been classified as non-free by the Free Software Foundation, while the Open Source Initiative stated, on Twitter, that the license is not an open source software license and that software distributed under such license is not open source.

According to the OES, "ethical licenses" are based in 7 principles defined for common goods, open work, accessibility, privacy or also transparency.

During the 2021 controversy around Richard Stallman returning to the FSF board, after his resignation in 2019, the OES issued a statement against it, and was one of the signatory organizations of an open letter with thousands of signatures.

== Examples of ethical licenses ==
- 996.ICU
- ACAB
- Anti-Capitalist
- BSD 3-Clause No Nuclear
- BSD 3-Clause No Military
- Do No Harm
- Hippocratic 3.0 (containing a custom license online generator)
- Peer Production

== See also ==
- Contributor Covenant
- Inclusive language
- Open source movement
- Women in Computing
