= Open Platform for NFV =

Open source platform

Open Platform for NFV is a collaborative open source platform for network functions virtualization. It was started by the Linux Foundation in 2014. Member companies include AT&T, Brocade Communications Systems, China Mobile, Cisco, Dell, Ericsson, Hewlett-Packard, Huawei, IBM, Intel, Juniper Networks, NEC, Nokia Networks, NTT DoCoMo, Orange S.A., Red Hat, Telecom Italia and Vodafone.
