= Sovereign Tech Agency =

German funder of open source software

The Sovereign Tech Agency is a subsidiary of the German Federal Agency for Breakthrough Innovation, commissioned by the Federal Ministry for Economic Affairs and Climate Action, aimed at providing financial support to open-source software. The initial funds were allocated by the Bundestag in May 2022.

== Purpose of funding ==
According to the federal budget of Germany plan, the program aims to promote and secure open-source foundational technologies. It intends to make the open-source ecosystem more resilient against external attacks, thereby enhancing cybersecurity and resilience across the German economy. This initiative fulfills a demand from the coalition government. This is also an approach to the classic free-rider problem faced by many open source projects.

The funding is described as time-limited and targeted at specific challenges or security vulnerabilities.

== Scope and organization ==
In 2022, the program had a budget of 13 million euros, which increased to approximately 22 million euros in 2023 and was expected to reach up to 16 million euros in 2024. The executive team consists of:

- Adriana Groh (co-CEO), previously from the Open Knowledge Foundation's Prototype Fund
- Luisa von Beust (co-CEO), previously at several commercial organizations
- Fiona Krakenbürger (CTO), previously worked at the Open Technology Fund

== Current programs ==
The Sovereign Tech Agency operates through several programs designed to strengthen the security and sustainability of digital infrastructure:

- Sovereign Tech Fund: This program provides strategic investments in open-source software components deemed essential for economic competitiveness and innovation. It focuses on core digital infrastructure to achieve cross-sector scaling, specifically benefiting startups and small to medium-sized enterprises (SMEs).
- Sovereign Tech Resilience: This initiative takes a proactive approach to protecting critical digital infrastructure. Beyond discovering and fixing existing vulnerabilities (including through bug bounty initiatives), the program aims to increase the long-term resilience of open infrastructure against future threats.
- Sovereign Tech Fellowship: Through a "Maintainer-in-Residence" model, the agency provides financial support to individual experts and maintainers. The program aims to ensure the sustainability of the human labor behind critical codebases, which is often underfunded or unrecognized.
- Sovereign Tech Challenge: Through a competition-based model, this program identifies structural challenges in the open-source ecosystem. It encourages the development of innovative solutions for emerging technologies and the securing of existing technological dependencies.

== Supported projects ==
As of April 2025, the following projects received funding:

- ActivityPub testsuite: €152,000
- Arch Linux Package Management (ALPM): €562,800
- coreutils: €99,060
- cURL: €195,500
- domain: €993,600 (Rust-API for DNS access)
- Drupal: €278,700
- The Eclipse Foundation: €515,200
- FFmpeg: €157,580
- Fortran ecosystem (e.g. Fortran Package Manager, fpm): €816.000 €182,930
- FreeBSD: €686,400
- GNOME: 1 million €
- GNU libmicrohttpd: €300,000
- GopenPGP/OpenPGP.js: €176,955
- GStreamer: €203,000
- JavaScript ecosystem (see also OpenJS below, for additional investment): €176,955
- JUnit: €180,000
- KDE: €1,285,200
- Log4j: €596,160
- Mamba: €349,875
- OpenBGPd: €200,000
- OpenBLAS: €263,000
- OpenJS (investment in JavaScript, see it also above): €874,940
- OpenStreetMap: €384,000
- OpenMLS: €195,000
- OpenSSH: €200,000
- Pendulum: €449,850
- PHP: €205,000
- Prossimo, part of Internet Security Research Group, to support projects including Rustls: €1,436,729
- Python Package Index: €1,056,672
- Reproducible builds: €353,430
- RubyGems & Bundler: €668,400
- Samba: €688,800
- Sequoia PGP: €900,000
- systemd: €455,000
- WireGuard: €209,000
- Yocto Project: €759,000

== Reception ==
In 2025, the Hans Böckler Foundation described the Sovereign Tech Agency in a study as an exemplary initiative for ensuring a sovereign digital infrastructure and attested to its effectiveness at levels ranging from concrete software development all the way up to the European digital infrastructure.

A study commissioned by OpenForum Europe, Fraunhofer ISI, and the European University Institute views the German Sovereign Tech Fund and its evolution into the Sovereign Tech Agency as a model for a significantly better-funded institution at the EU level and suggests that “... the establishment of the EU-STF should be modelled closely on the German STF – with only small differences in terms of points of emphasis and strategic positioning.”

The F5 Alliance—comprising AlgorithmWatch, Gesellschaft für Freiheitsrechte, Open Knowledge Foundation Germany, Reporters Without Borders, and Wikimedia Germany—cites the Sovereign Tech Agency as one of the “good approaches” in the EU for reducing dependence on U.S. tech companies in particular, but also criticizes its insufficient funding.

The European Commission views the Sovereign Tech Agency as a model organization for promoting open-source infrastructure. Its successful establishment and subsequent work are supported by a set of clearly defined best practices and have attracted interest both among EU member states and at the EU level itself.

== See also ==
- NLnet
- Next Generation Internet
- Horizon 2020
- Horizon Europe
- EU Sovereign Tech Fund (EU-STF)
- Technological sovereignty
