= Free and Open Source Software Conference India =

Annual software conference

The Free and Open Source Software Conference India (FossCon India) is planned to be an annual, three days conference for the discussion, and promotion of the Free and open-source software.

== History ==
Year	Location	Number of Attendees
2019	Belagavi, India	150

== Locations ==
- Belagavi, India - Started in 2019

== Keynote Speakers ==
Name	Profession	Current Employer	Function	Former Employer	Edition
Ramachandra T V, PhD	Professor	Centre for Ecological Sciences, IISc	Senior Scientific Officer		FossCon 2019
Uday Shankar Puranik, PhD	Data Scientist and Science Writer	Atal Innovation Mission, Bengaluru	Mentor for Artificial Intelligence and Machine learning	IBM India	FossCon 2019
