= Open-source bounty =

Monetary reward for completing a project task

An open-source bounty is a monetary reward for completing a task in an open-source software project.

== Description ==
Bounties are usually offered as an incentive for fixing software bugs or implementing minor features. Bounty driven development is one of the business models for open-source software. The compensation offered for an open-source bounty is usually small.

== Examples of bounties ==
- 2023: The Prettier Challenge to write a Rust program that would pass 95% of the test suite for the prettier code formatter was completed within three weeks, with an award of $22,500 to Biome contributors.
- 2018: Mozilla Firefox's WebRTC (Web Real-Time Communications) bug was submitted by Education First to Bountysource for $50,000.
- 2015: Artifex Software offered up to $1000 to anyone who fixes some of the issues posted on Ghostscript Bugzilla.
- 2008: Sun Microsystems (acquired by Oracle Corporation in 2010) announced $1 million in bounties for developing OpenSolaris, NetBeans, OpenSPARC, GlassFish, OpenOffice.org, and OpenJDK.
- 2004: Mozilla introduced a Security Bug Bounty Program, offering $500 to anyone who finds a "critical" security bug in Mozilla.
- Two software bounties were completed for the Amiga Research Operating System (AROS), implementing a free Kickstart ROM replacement for use with the UAE emulator and FPGA Amiga reimplementations, as well as original Amiga hardware.
- RISC OS Open bounty scheme to encourage development of RISC OS
- AmiZilla was an over $11,000 bounty to port the Firefox web browser to AmigaOS, MorphOS and AROS. While the bounty produced few direct results, it inspired many bounty systems in the Amiga community, including Timberwolf, Power2people, AROS Bounties, and Amigabounty.net .

== See also ==
- Bountysource
- Bug bounty program
- Business models for open-source software
- Crowdfunding
- Google Summer of Code
