= EU Sovereign Tech Fund =

Proposed fund for open source software

- Abbreviation: EU-STF
- Formation: 2025 (Proposal)
- Type: Proposed EU funding instrument
- Region served: European Union

The EU Sovereign Tech Fund (EU-STF) is a proposed financial instrument for the European Union aimed at providing sustained funding for the maintenance, security, and resilience of critical open-source software (OSS) components used across Europe's digital economy and public sector.

The proposal is modeled after Germany's Sovereign Tech Agency, which has raised over €24.6 million for open digital infrastructure. It was also outlined in a 2025 feasibility study commissioned by GitHub and published by OpenForum Europe, the Fraunhofer ISI, and the European University Institute. Supporters view the initiative as a core element of the EU's push for "digital sovereignty" and increased cybersecurity.

== Background ==
Policymakers and industry analysts describe the status of critical open-source software maintenance as a "market failure" or a "silent crisis." While open-source software is estimated to be present in 96% of all codebases and contributes a minimum of €65–95 billion annually to the EU economy, the maintenance work for many foundational components is chronically underfunded. Data cited in the feasibility study found that one-third of OSS maintainers are unpaid, and many critical projects are maintained by small, overworked teams of three people or fewer.

This reliance on under-resourced communities for essential digital public goods has been identified as a systemic vulnerability and a strategic risk to Europe's digital infrastructure and cybersecurity. The proposal situates the EU-STF as a way to remediate this deficit at scale, supporting Europe’s ability to comply with new regulations like the Cyber Resilience Act.

== Proposal ==
The proposed EU-STF mechanism is intended to provide sustained, targeted public funding for foundational technologies below the application layer, rather than duplicating existing EU instruments that focus primarily on innovation. The fund’s activities would focus on:

- Identifying the EU's most critical open-source dependencies.
- Providing long-term investments in maintenance, security, and improvement.
- Strengthening the open-source ecosystem, which includes support for individuals, nonprofits, and companies

=== Design and budget ===
The 2025 study proposed a minimum budget contribution of €350 million from the upcoming EU Multiannual Financial Framework for the 2028–2035 period, with the expectation that this would leverage co-financing from national governments and industry.

The study outlines seven key design criteria for the fund, inspired by successful existing models:

- Pooled financing: Allowing the EU, national governments, and industry (like Mercedes-Benz and SAP) to contribute to a single funding pot.
- Low bureaucracy: Implementing simple application processes and minimal reporting to reducing the burden on maintainers
- Political independence: Ensuring a continuous focus on foundational technology maintenance, rather than pivoting based on political trends.
- Flexible funding: The ability to fund contributors regardless of their EU residency, provided the work benefits EU society and the economy.
- Community focus: Prioritizing collaboration with the open-source community to define needs and design funding processes.
- Strategic alignment: Demonstrating a clear positive impact on EU strategic goals, including competitiveness and cybersecurity.
- Transparency: Maintaining high standards in governance and funding decisions.

== Relation to national programmes ==
The concept is directly inspired by Germany’s Sovereign Tech Fund, which is administered by the Sovereign Tech Agency. The German fund, established by the Federal Ministry for Economic Affairs and Climate Action, invested over €23 million in approximately 60 open-source projects between 2022 and 2024. These investments targeted foundational technologies like cURL and GNOME.

The EU-STF aims to scale this targeted public investment model to a pan-European level, moving away from fragmented national or siloed EU efforts.

== Reception ==
The proposal has been met with support from major technology companies and political observers. GitHub, which commissioned the study, publicly advocated for the fund, noting it could help Europe establish a unique "third way" in technology policy, emphasizing transparency and public value, separate from the platform monopolies of the United States and the centralized models of China. Industry leaders, including Mercedes-Benz, SAP, Nextcloud, and others, have also voiced support for the concept.

Commentators have pointed out that the lack of specific, dedicated open-source funding in the EU's proposed multi-trillion-euro budget for 2028–2035 is a "glaring but reversible oversight," making the EU-STF proposal a critical and timely intervention. Others have suggested that initiatives such as the EU Sovereign Tech Fund reflect a narrow interpretation of “digital sovereignty” that may underplay civic and democratic dimensions of technology governance.

== See also ==
- Digital Europe Programme
- Cyber Resilience Act
