= Charles W. Bullard =

American criminal

Charles W. Bullard was an American criminal. Known as Piano Charley, he became a notorious safecracker. His name derived from his skill as a musician.

One of his criminal partnerships was with Adam Worth. In 1869, together with Fredericka Mandelbaum and others, Worth helped Bullard to escape from prison where he was serving a sentence for stealing $100,000 worth of goods from the Hudson River Railway Express. For the escape, Mandelbaum and her associates rented an office across the street from the prison and tunneled into Bullard's cell, bribing two guards to keep them quiet.

Later that year, on November 20, Bullard and Worth worked together to rob the vault of Boylston National Bank in Boston. They escaped with an estimated $200,000. However, aware of the intense police interest in the crime, they were forced to move to England and live under false names.

Bullard died in a Liège, Belgium jail in the 1890s.
