= The Society for the Relief of the Homeless Poor =

Historic homeless shelter in London

- Founded: 30 January 1820
- Founder: George Bridges
- Type: Not-for-profit
- Purpose: Housing and homelessness
- Location: Wandsworth, London, UK
- Region served: London
- Key people: Jackie Dymond; Rodney Brobbey
- Website: www.westernlodge.org.uk
- Formerly called: Western Lodge

The Society for the Relief of the Homeless Poor is one of the oldest homeless shelters in London, dating back to 1820 when it was set up to respond to individuals left destitute after the Napoleonic War. One of the founders and the first Chairman was George Bridges, an Alderman of London at the time.

== History ==
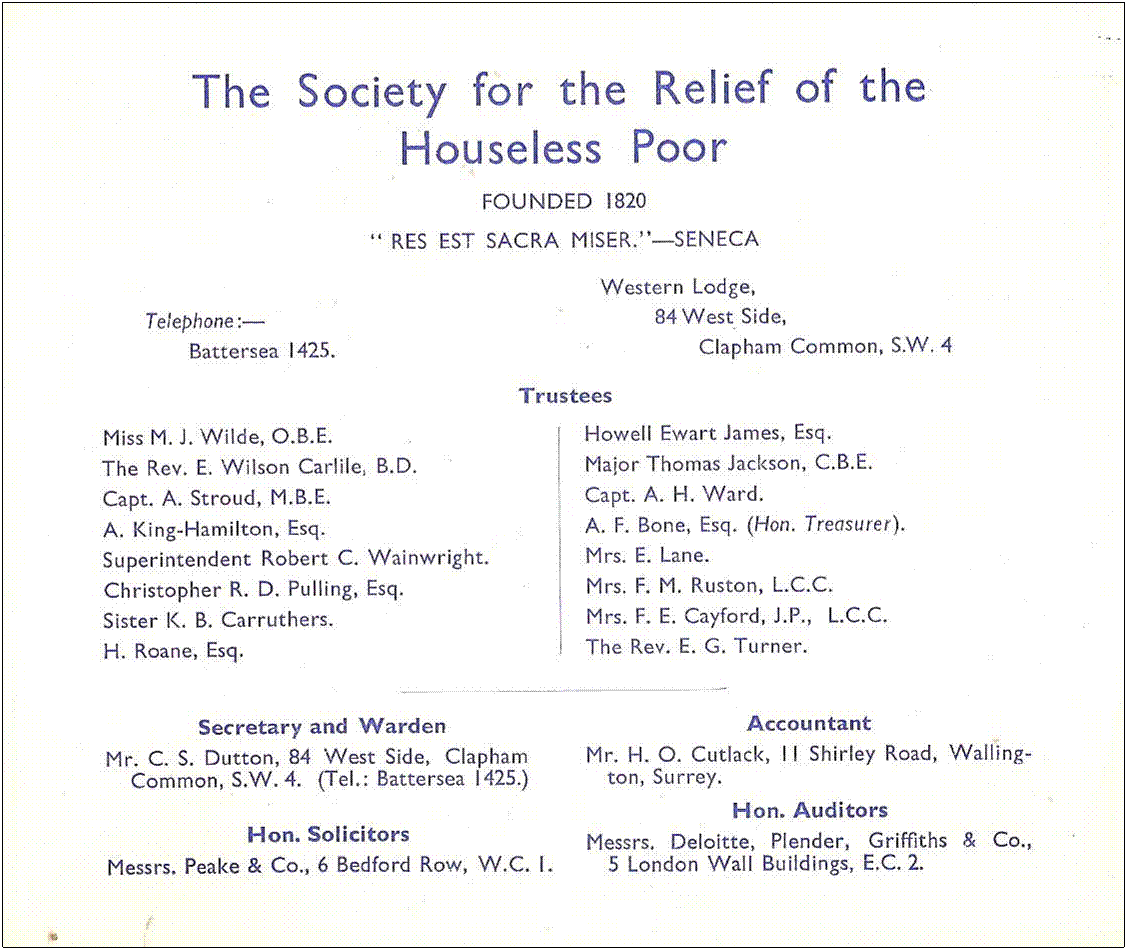
Old Trustees of Western Lodge, including Wilson Carlile

Additionally, The Society was seen as essential to providing nightly shelter and sustenance to the homeless found wandering about London during inclement winter seasons. One of the founders and the first Chairman was the Rt. Hon. George Bridges, M.P. Lord Mayor of London and an Alderman of London at the time. The origin dates back to a public meeting held on 30 January 1820 at London Wall at which it was resolved to open at once a "subscription" in order to aid homeless people. At its peak, The Society housed and fed 550 people, during a later slump in 1856 Charles Dickens wrote in 'Household Words' of his visit to the asylum in Whitecross Street and the residents he observed there; "I believe I have sufficient knowledge of the street-world to tell a professional beggar from a starving man: but I declare I saw no face that passed the hatch but in which I could read: Ragged and Tired, Dead Beat, Utterly Destitute, Houseless and Hungry."

In 1912 it was deemed necessary to register trusteeship and it was decided that there should be representatives from: The Corporation of the City of London, The Westminster City Council, The Bishop of London and Southwark, The Commissioners of the City of London and Metropolitan Police, and The Church Army

These organisations provided the necessary management and support, with the Church Army taking a particularly pro-active role in day-to-day affairs and there founder Revd Wilson Carlile sitting on the board of trustees for The Society for the Relief of the Homeless Poor from 1912 onwards.

== Western Lodge, Clapham ==
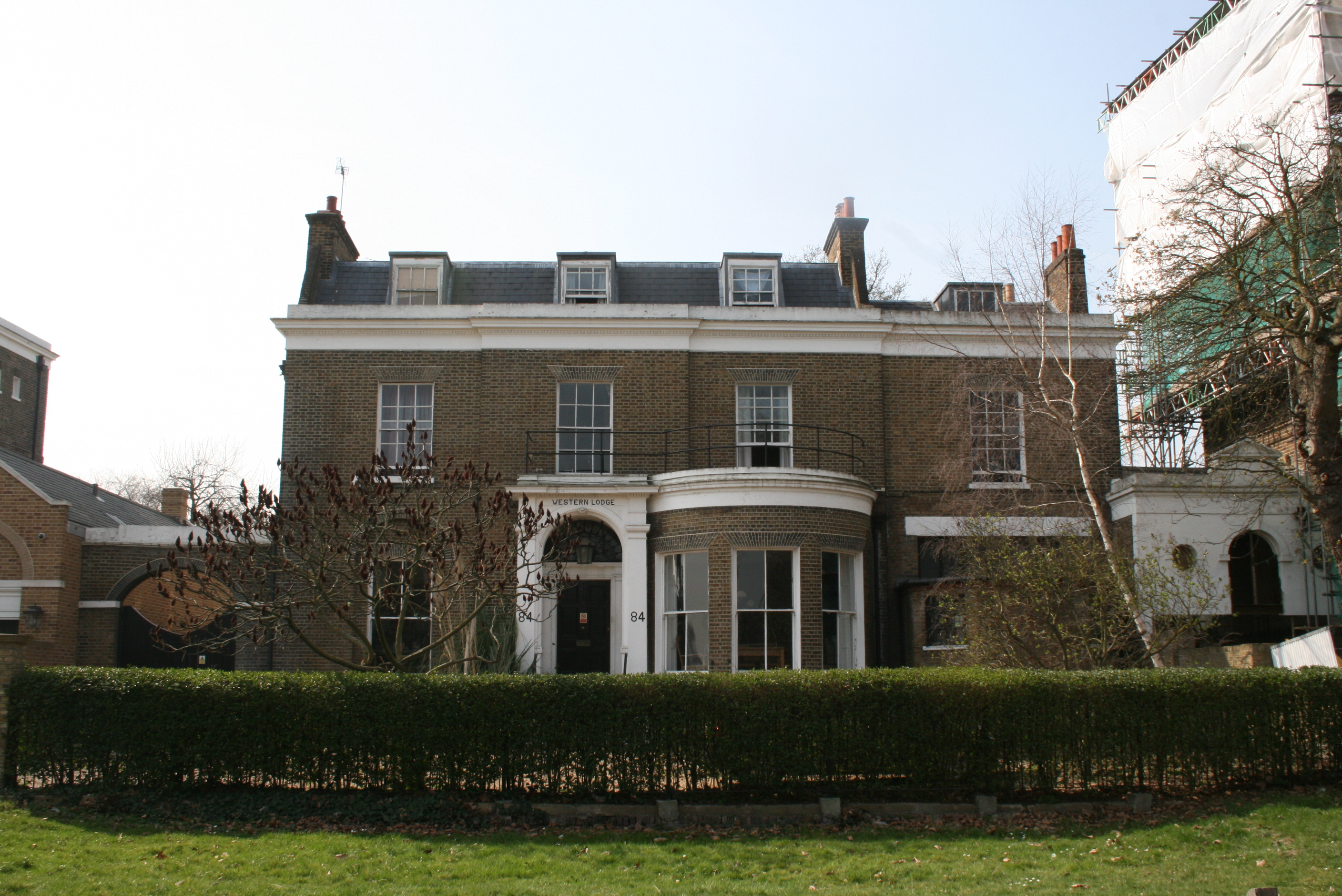
Western Lodge, Clapham Common West Side

The Chapel at Western Lodge around 1926

The current location and working name of the charity is Western Lodge on Clapham Common; the building is a Georgian Mansion house donated to the Society in 1925 by a generous supporter. Western Lodge was built in about 1800 and since its donation to The Society for the Relief of the Homeless Poor. The property has undergone many refurbishments. At its peak it was able to house 27 men in large dormitories which have since been sectioned into individual rooms.

=== Notable residents ===
The first to live in Western Lodge was Thomas Whitaker, but in the year of Waterloo it was leased by "that genial buccaneer" Richard Thornton a prominent figure on the Baltic Exchange at Lloyd's. A bachelor business man, he made a large fortune and when he died in 1865 he was said to be worth nearly three million pounds.

The next resident, in 1828, was Sir James Mackintosh, philosopher, historian and Whig parliamentarian who will always be remembered for his work for the repeal of many of the savage penal laws of his day. In November 1829 his niece Emma Wedgwood, who later married Charles Darwin, paid him a visit which his mother describes in a letter: "I have just heard of her arrival at Clapham, and seeing the dining room all lighted up as she drove into the court, and the Historian himself in full discourse (as she saw through the window) with a party of gentlemen. Emma, however, desired to be shown up to Mrs Rich's room, where she had a very comfortable cup of tea and a chat with her. Fanny came up to ask Emma whether she would come down and see Mr William Wilberforce but she declined, and I dare say Mackintosh thought her a great fool for doing so."

In 1843 the house was taken by Charles Trevelyan, then Assistant Secretary to the Treasury, and brother-in-law of Lord Macaulay whose favourite sister Hannah he had married in 1834. The Trevelayans lived at Western Lodge for eight years with their three children, and Macaulay was a frequent and much loved visitor.

=== The Gentlemen Thief ===
Perhaps the most notorious of Western Lodge's previous owners was Adam Worth (who was nicknamed The Napoleon of crime), who purchased Western Lodge in 1875. On 26 May 1876 he stole Thomas Gainsborough's celebrated portrait of Georgiana Cavendish, Duchess of Devonshire. The rolled up painting supposedly remained in the Coach House on the grounds of Western Lodge for a decade.

== Western Lodge, Tooting ==
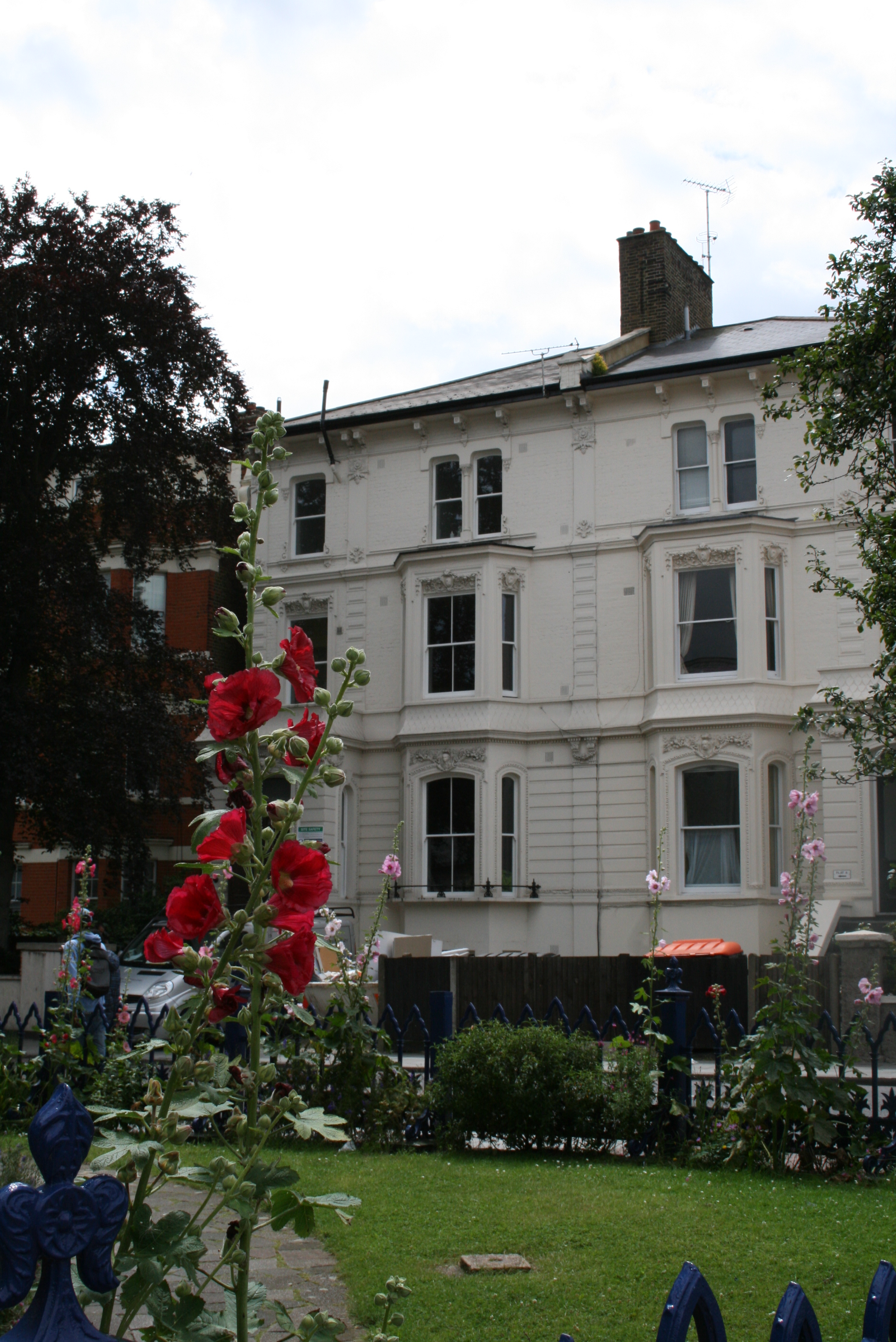
The new property at 85 Trinity Road, Tooting

It is proposed that the charity moves to another Victorian property in Tooting Bec.
