= IBM India =

Indian subsidiary

IBM India Private Limited
- Company type: Subsidiary
- Industry: Computer hardware Consulting; IT Services
- Headquarters: Bangalore, Karnataka, India
- Key people: Sandip Patel, Managing Director, IBM India Private Limited, & South Asia Head
- Products: See complete products listing
- Number of employees: ~ 100,000
- Parent: IBM
- Website: www.ibm.com/in-en

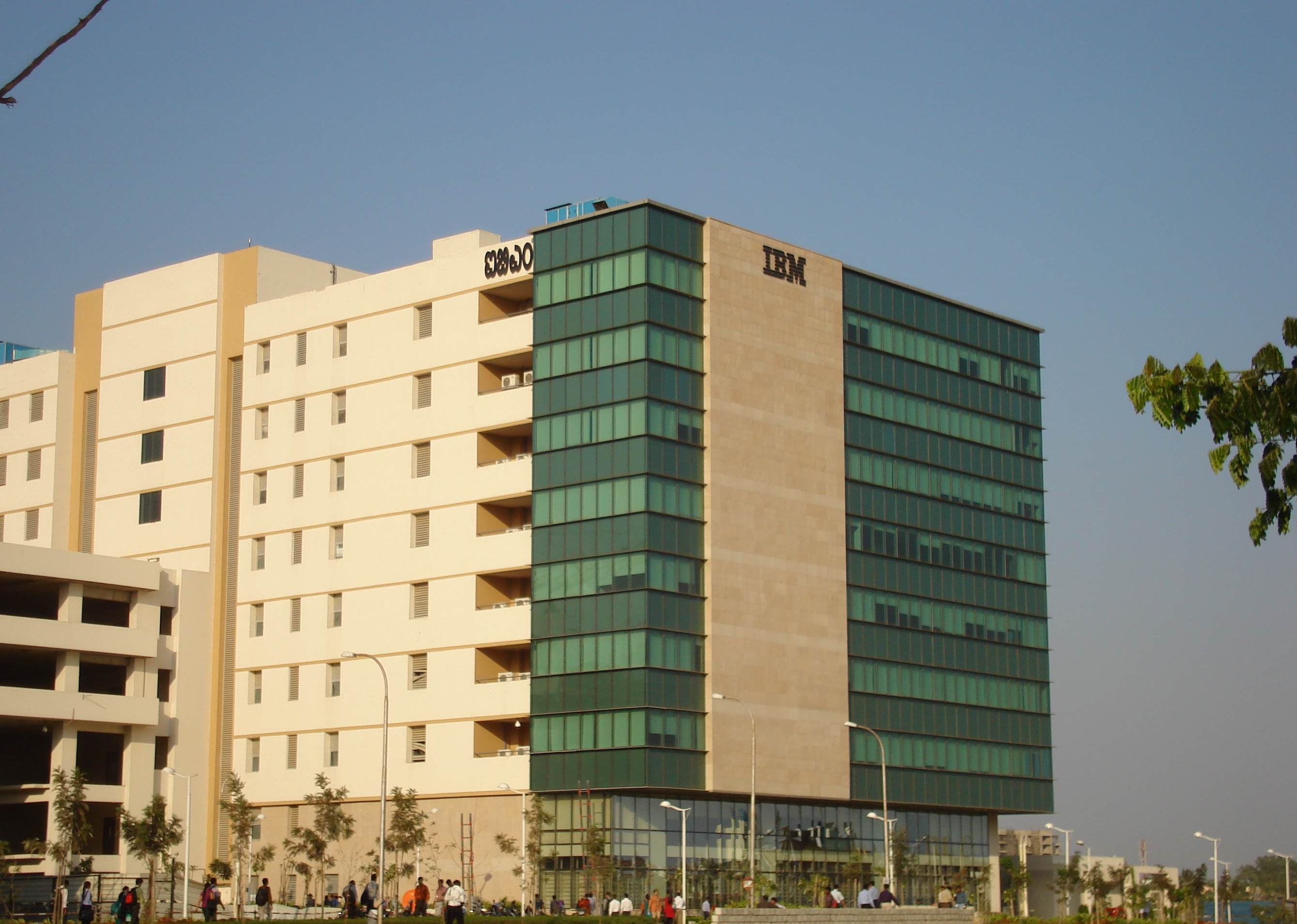
IBM India Building at Manyata Tech Park in Bangalore.

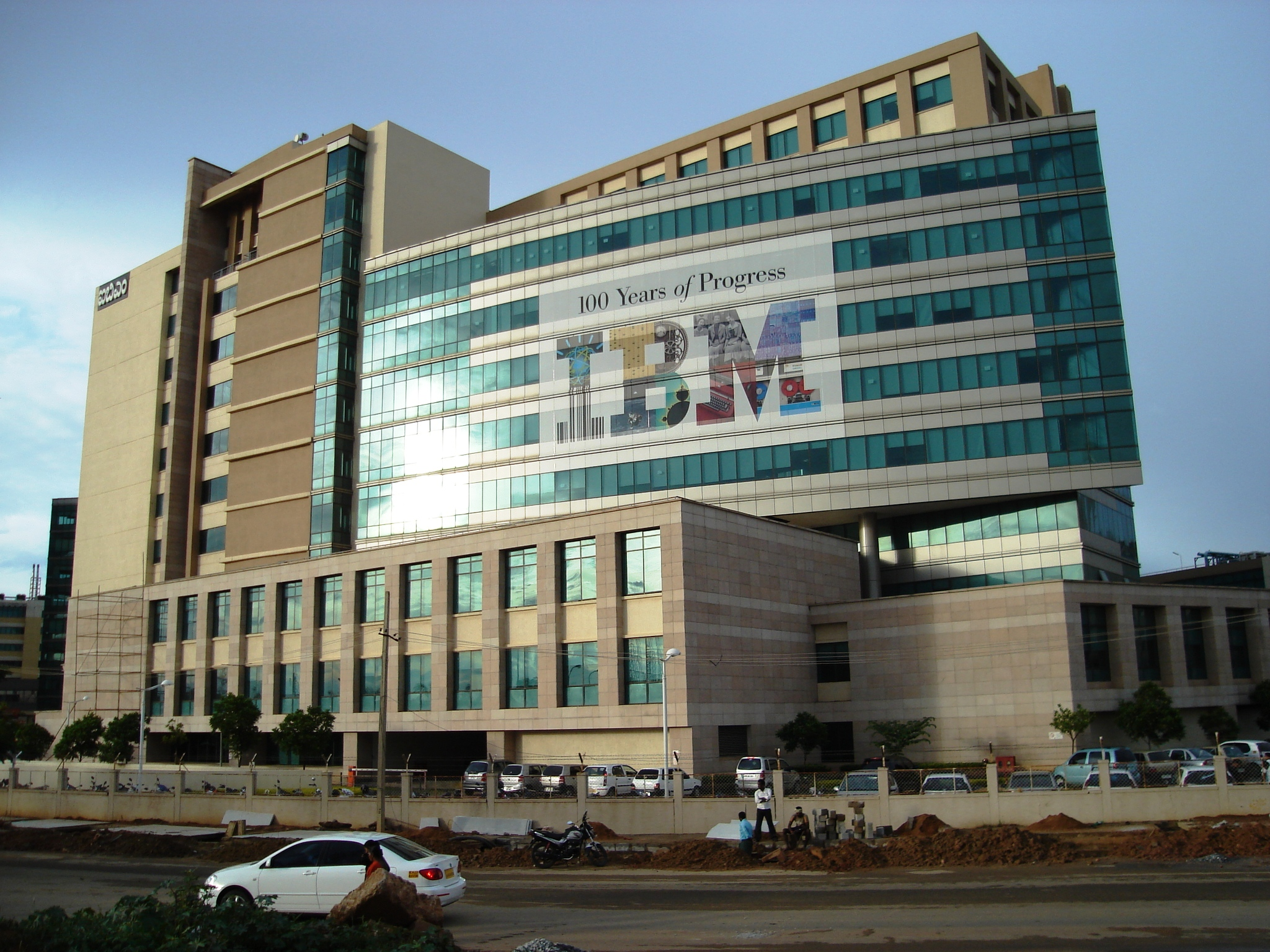
IBM India building in Bangalore, decorated as part of the centennial year celebrations.

IBM India Private Limited is the Indian subsidiary of IBM. It has facilities in Ahmedabad, Bengaluru, Bhubaneshwar, Chennai, Coimbatore, Delhi, Gurgaon, Hyderabad, Kochi, Kolkata, Mumbai, Noida, Pune, Mysore and Visakhapatnam.

Between 2003 and 2007, IBM's head count in India has grown by almost 800%, from 9,000 in 2003 to nearly 74,000 in 2007. Since 2006, IBM has been the multinational with the largest number of employees in India. IBM is very secretive about the geographic distribution of its employees. By most estimates, it has close to a third of its 288,000 employees (~ 100,000) in India, and it likely has more employees there than in the US.

== Growth and future initiatives ==
IBM, in an analyst meeting held at Bangalore on 6 June 2005 stated that IBM's India plans are for the long term & committed to invest $6 billion in the next three years in India, triple the amount invested in the three years preceding the meeting.

IBM worldwide expects its revenues to be around $120 billion by 2010, of which nearly $86 billion (68%) would come from IBM Consulting alone, with an estimate of about 80,000 employees. IBM India would account for 90,000 of these. Roughly translated, IBM's Indian employees would generate $35 billion of IBM's revenues in 2010.

IBM Global Services (now split to Business Services & Technical Services) was called the "jewel in the IBM crown" by the Aberdeen group in 2003. For worldwide IBM, this is the group that contributes to more than half its global revenues ($54 billion in 2005) presently and growing at a healthy rate (8% in 2005). With half of global service employees to be located in India, IBM India's importance for the global corporation can be easily fathomed.

=== IBM's re-organization ===
In 2005., Ginni Rometty at the Enterprise Business Services unit of IBM worldwide and heralded changes that would have long running implications and would lead to the explosive growth of IBM in India. To emphasize how serious IBM was about making India a major IBM headcount and business growth destination, a Global Briefing event for investors and analysts was held in Bangalore in June 2006 with India's then President Abdul Kalam as the Chief Guest. Most of the senior most IBM executives were present for the event. To bring more focus to growing the technical talent in India, IBM appointed IBM Fellow C. Mohan of IBM Research in Silicon Valley as the IBM India Chief Scientist, a new position that was created for that purpose. Mohan served in that position from June 2006 to January 2009 in Bangalore and then returned to IBM Research – Almaden.

At an investor meet in 2006, she identified five areas that would transform IBM and bring 'profitable growth'. In order of importance, they were Business Transformation Outsourcing, Application Management Services, Business Solutions, Small & Medium Business & Innovation. In each one of these areas, IBM India figures prominently and employee numbers have grown multi-fold in the last two years.

IBM India's domestic revenues grew at 60% in 2005-06 making it one of the highest growth areas in the entire IBM portfolio of geographies & businesses. IBM India is also the biggest domestic IT player in the country, replacing HCL Technologies. It's worthwhile to mention that Airtel, India's largest private telecom company which had chosen IBM as its strategic partner for outsourcing its entire network & IT backbone – a deal worth about $750 million initially, has decided to renew it for another five years, reducing the order by more than half the size of the one that expired at the end of March 2014.

== History ==
Year	Employees
2000	5001
2003	9,000
2004	23,010
2005	38,500
2006	53,000
2007	74,000
2008	94,000
2009	112,900
2010	131,001

=== Pre-liberalization story ===
In making the change to its new mode of operation, a number of restructuring steps were taken: - All installed equipment (equipment in India was all leased by the month – a GOI requirement) was 'sold' to the existing users for a nominal amount of less than $10 - The (profitable) Service Bureaus were given to the employees who were employed in them at that time. A management structure was established, based upon several of the most senior Indian managers, who collectively became the majority shareholders in the new company, which they named IDM (International Data Management) - The equipment service business was transferred as a single total entity to the GOI, on the understanding that they would continue to offer maintenance service to all existing users. IBM undertook to provide spare parts for installed equipment for at least a further 5 years - Employees who were working in other countries at that time were offered positions in those countries, if the immigration laws allowed. Most accepted and a number went on to achieve promotions to senior positions in those countries and around the world - The employment of all other employees was terminated, with what were generally considered to be generous redundancy terms.

=== Post-liberalization story ===
The Indian economy was liberalized in 1991, relaxing FDI norms. IBM re-entered India in 1987 with a Tata joint-venture, named Tata Information Systems Ltd. Its business interest in India was still focused on product sales.

=== Current activities ===
IBM India has now grown to an extent where it poses a stiff challenge to homegrown Software companies of India in IT global delivery and manpower attraction/retention. It now operates the following business lines from India which contributes to worldwide IBM in a global delivery framework: India Software Labs (ISL), India Research Lab (IRL), Linux Technology Center, Global Business Services(GBS), Global Technology Services (GTS) formerly known as ITD-GD (Information Technology Delivery – Global Delivery), Global Business Solutions Center (GBSC), Sales & Distribution (S&D), Integrated Technology Services (ITS).

On 2 March 2012 it was reported that IBM India wants to open sales office in around 40 Tier-I and Tier-II cities of India in year 2012–2013.

== Country managers ==
The head of IBM India is called a country manager. These people have headed IBM India during its history in the country.

- 1966–1976 – Alec Taylor
- 1976–1978 – T Brian Finn
- 1992–1994 – Michael Klein
- 1994–1996 – John R. Whiting
- 1996–1998 – Ravi Marwaha
- 1998–2000 – Ranjit Limaye
- 2001–2004 – Abraham Thomas, currently in IBM Singapore
- 2004–2012 – Shanker Annaswamy
- 2012–2016 – Vanitha Narayanan
- 2017–2019 – Karan Bajwa
- 2020 – Sandip Patel
