= Sachiko Muto =

Swedish academic

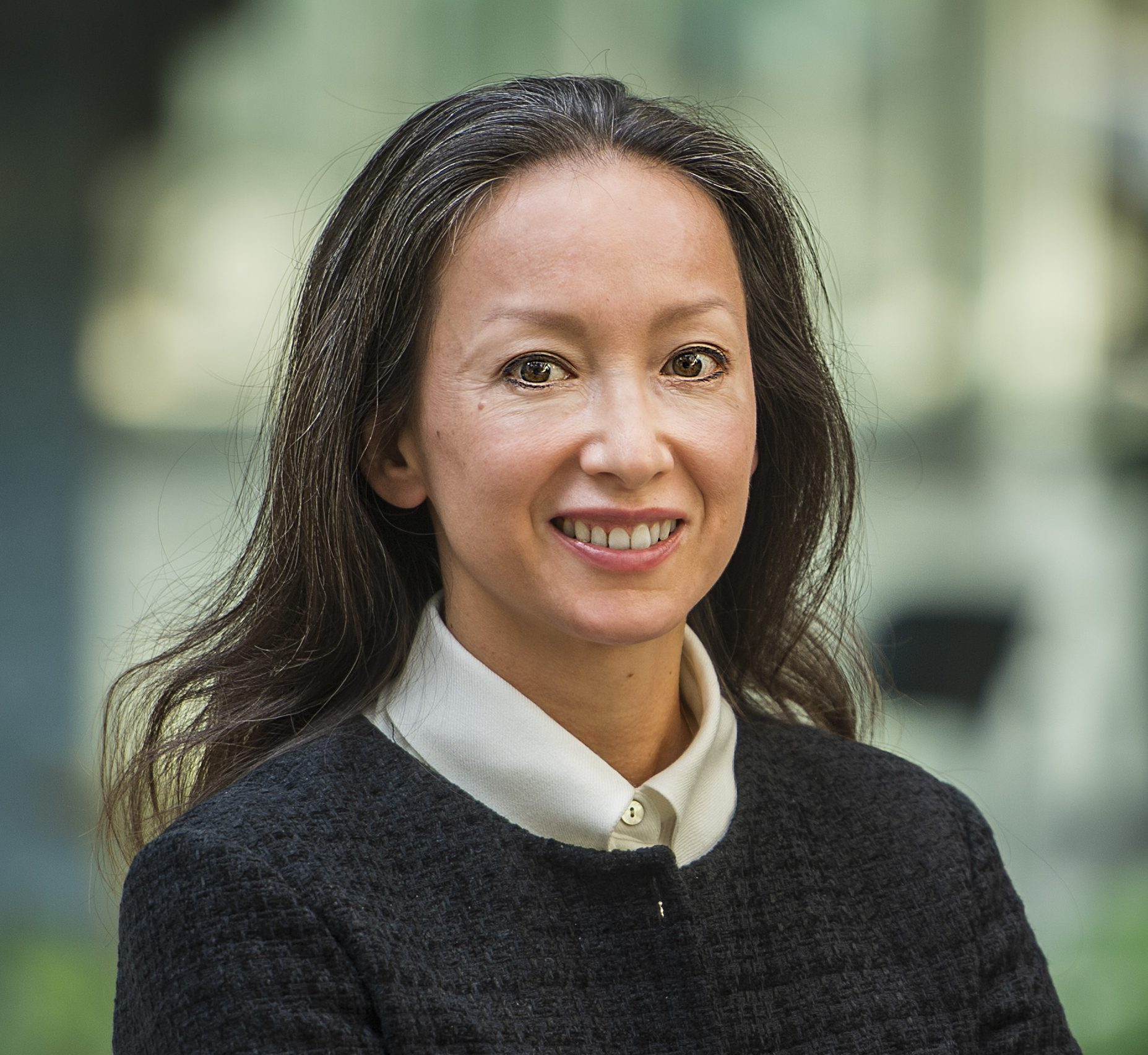
- Sachiko Muto in 2021
- Born: May 1975; Copenhagen, Denmark
- Education: University of Toronto, London School of Economics
- Occupations: academic; open source advocate

Sachiko Muto (born in 1975) is a Swedish academic and open source advocate.

== Education and early career ==
Muto completed a bachelor's degree in international relations and political science at the University of Toronto in 2000. In 2002, she completed a master's degree in European politics and policy at the London School of Economics.

Muto started her career in European affairs as an intern at Directorate-General for Research and Innovation.

Subsequently, she worked for ten years in policy making in Brussels before moving to California.

== Academic research ==
Muto's area of research is social and political implications of technological change. She obtained her doctorate in standardization policy from Delft University. She was previously a researcher with UC Berkeley, from 2012 to 2014.

Muto is also a senior researcher at RISE in Sweden. She is a frequent commentator on the question of impact of standards on the environment.

== Advocacy work ==
Muto joined OpenForum Europe in 2007. She was advocating for open standards in the context of the Microsoft antitrust case in 2008.

In 2016, Muto became the CEO of OpenForum Europe, replacing the founder Graham Taylor.

In her role, she argued for focusing investment in Europe on open source software to preserve the competitiveness of the continent.

In 2022, Muto welcomed the creation of Linux Foundation Europe, to reinforce the advocates of open source in the EU. She put forward the importance of open source in fostering a culture of collaboration in Europe. According to Muto, investment in open source software would contribute to more growth and could put Europe in a leadership position. Muto in particular called on the European Commission to assume a more assertive role in coordinating the efforts to develop open source. From the perspective of users Muto, expressed concerns about privacy that would be best ensured through open source.

Muto is a board member of the open-source content management system (CMS) Drupal.

== Personal life ==
Muto lived in Belgium and the UK. She lived for five years in Cupertino, US before returning to Belgium in 2016 together with her family.
