= Illumination Software Creator =

- Developer(s): Bryan Lunduke
- Stable release: 5.0
- Preview release: 6.0 Beta 9
- Operating system: Linux, Microsoft Windows, Mac OS X, Android, iOS, Maemo
- Type: Programming
- License: GPL
- Website: Lunduke.com
- As of: May 2013

Illumination Software Creator (Illumination) is a tool for visually designing and developing software, and a corresponding Visual programming language that is available for Microsoft Windows, Linux and Mac OS X. Software developed with Illumination runs on Microsoft Windows, Linux, Mac OS X, Android, iOS, Maemo, and Adobe Flash-powered websites. Illumination is developed and sold by Bryan Lunduke. Source code is also available to buy under three levels of licensing.

== History ==
Illumination was created by Bryan Lunduke, and first released in May 2010. The earliest known public mention of Illumination was on the April 11, 2010 episode of The Linux Action Show!.

On June 6, 2012 the Illumination was released as open source software, as attempt to innovate a donation-driven Business model for open-source software. After initially achieving the requested amount of money, on July 12, 2012 deficit of target sums from donations resulted in the source closing, and a fee being attached for download of binaries. On November 28, 2012 the source code for current versions became available for purchase, under a Personal Proprietary License, the GNU General Public License, and a BSD license. On November 28, 2012 the business model was changed, allowing download of all premium lunduke.com content, including this software, for a minimum donation of $2.

== Features ==
Illumination works by arranging "building blocks" in order to visually describe the functionality of a software application. Like many other Visual programming languages, Illumination does not require any code to be written by hand in order to develop software.

Within Illumination each "Block" is a self-contained piece of functionality. Blocks are tied together via "inputs" and "outputs" which pass no data, and only serve to structure the flow of the application. Illumination also contains a "Window Editor" to allow for the building of applications with simple user interfaces.

As of 2.0, Illumination Software Creator supports creating Python (PyGTK) applications as two distinct targets: Desktop and Maemo Tablet. And also supports creating Adobe Flex based rich Internet applications that run on the Adobe Flash platform.

At version 2.1 support for building Android applications was added.

In version 2.2 support for building what are called "Custom Blocks" was added to allow developers to expand the functionality of their projects as needed using traditional programming languages (such as Java, Python and ActionScript).

For version 3.0 support for building iOS applications was added.

For version 4.0, released on September 7, 2011, support for building HTML5 applications and including graphics was added.

For version 4.2, released on February 6, 2012, Portal Blocks have been added.

== Illumination Software Creation Station ==
The Illumination Software Creation Station is an Opensuse based Linux distribution, built with Susestudio, that provides a pre-setup system for testing and using Illumination Software Creator as a Live-CD or VMWare virtual machine.

On Dec 16th, 2010, the Illumination Software Creation Station won the first annual Novell Disters award for best software appliance built with Susestudio.
