= Timberwolf (web browser) =

Port of Firefox to the AmigaOS 4 platform

Timberwolf web browser
- Developer(s): Thomas Frieden and Hans-Joerg Frieden
- Initial release: June 9, 2010; 14 years ago
- Stable release: 4.0.1.0252 / September 5, 2012; 12 years ago
- Preview release: Release Candidate 3 / September 5, 2012; 12 years ago
- Written in: C, XUL
- Operating system: AmigaOS 4
- Type: Web browser
- Website: friedenhq.org/amiga/timberwolf/

Timberwolf was a port of the Firefox web browser to the AmigaOS 4 platform.

== History ==
Timberwolf was a bounty-funded project to port Mozilla Firefox to AmigaOS 4. It was started in early 2009 as a parallel to AmiZilla, which had the same intent. AmiZilla had a more complex history, as it was started in 2003 by the US firm DiscreetFX with the target of porting a running version of the Gecko engine-based Firefox compatible browser to Amiga platforms. As AmiZilla was too ambitious, the project was halted on November 19, 2009, without significant results. Timberwolf was originally managed by Thomas and Hans-Joerg Frieden (AmigaOS 4 core developers).

The first release was made public in June 2010. On July 23, 2012, the project was declared to be complete and the money (€6732.72) was transferred to the Friedens.

At some point after the bounty was closed the Friedens ceased work on the project. In 2013 Steven Solie (AmigaOS 4 Team Lead) obtained the source code and began working on Timberwolf with an unspecified group of part-time developers.
