= AmiZilla =

AmiZilla was an ongoing project sponsored by DiscreetFX which tried to port the Mozilla Firefox browser - and other Mozilla projects - to AmigaOS, MorphOS and AROS, and to fund efforts for achieving that goal.

== History ==
This project started in May 2003 from an idea of DiscreetFX, a firm based in United States (Chicago, Illinois) which supports still existing Amiga Video Toaster market and produces and sells programs and Digital/FX sample collections for amateur, professional and broadcast studios customers. The AmiZilla project started in the form of bounty contest (i.e. donors uses internet online funding & money-transfer resources like PayPal to donate a free amount of money, which will be collected as a whole "booty" sum of money and then used to "pay" the person or the team who proves himself to be capable of realizing the whole project). The project was announced on Amigaworld Portal on May 19, 2003, with an amount of $1000 USD, and in only one day it collected $2000 by donations, climbing from $1000 to $3000. Noteworthy for a very little community of users, by June 11, 2003, it had reached more than $4000, and this enormous effort, and the rapid rampage in collecting money by the Amiga users (who were considered a sparse community) was noted also by Mozillazine online news portal, and by Slashdot online magazine. As of 2007, a port of Mozilla's SpiderMonkey JavaScript engine was achieved, while a recompile of NSPR was in pre-alpha development. In the intentions of the support team, the future goals of the project included better support through the Cairo 2D graphics library which is slated for integration into the codebase of Firefox 3 (code-named Gran Paradiso), that was already ported to the Amiga platform. The AmiZilla project was closed November 19, 2009 without realizing significant results mainly due to the retirement of a contribution of over $5,000 donated by a former Netscape executive who wanted to keep his anonymity and was tired of waiting for results that never come. The project during its entire life was capable to raise the noteworthy sum of $11,869.64 (as evidenced in the page of donors at its site). Part of this amount of money was then transferred to TimberWolf browser bounty, and the main part of the money was given back to the former donors. The abrupt closing of the AmiZilla project caused a vast echo in Amiga community and started a flamewar on Amiga community discussion sites, because just some day before Amizilla Project ceased its operations, it were released to public the first screenshots of TimberWolf Browser by Friedens bothers. Some members of the Amiga community thought Timberwolf should be considered as the candidate to win the whole booty amount of money collected by the AmiZilla Project. But many others disagreed since Timberwolf had its own Bounty, set of rules and requirements and was only for Amiga OS 4.1.

== Rules ==
There were certain rules for AmiZilla project to be accomplished by those developers who wanted to achieve the full prize bounty. The main rule was that AmiZilla should be an open source port of any of the Mozilla/Firefox browsers to AmigaOS and other Amiga-inspired platforms (MorphOS and AROS).

== Results of the AmiZilla project ==
The only team, which officially announced to work on the bounty, created a public SourceForge source code repository, but only a few developers joined and not very much source code was committed. So the project died before it could reach any results.

Despite its apparent lack of success, the AmiZilla Bounty Project inspired many bounty systems that were created upon AmiZilla's example.

== Other AmigaOS Firefox Projects ==
A separate effort to port Firefox to AmigaOS 4 was started in early 2009 and still ongoing. It is named "Project Timberwolf". Screen shots and more information about Timberwolf was made public in November 2009, some days before AmiZilla project was closed abruptly, and then, on June 9, 2010, an alpha release of Timberwolf was made available for free download on pages the Project Timberwolf site. A beta of Timberwolf for AmigaOS 4.1 came out on February 16, 2012.
