= Bountysource =

Crowdsourcing website

- Website type: Crowdfunding, bounties
- Available in: English
- Headquarters: San Francisco, California, {{{location_country}}}
- Website: www.bountysource.com
- Commercial: Yes
- Launched: 2003, relaunch in 2012

Bountysource was a crowdsourcing website for open source bounties and since 2012 also for crowdfunding. Users (called "backers") could pledge money for tasks using micropayment services that open-source software developers can pick up and solve to earn the money. It also allowed large-scale fundraising for big improvements on the project. It integrated with GitHub using its bug tracker to check if the problem is resolved and connect the resolution with GitHub's pull request system to identify the patch. When the users agree that they are satisfied and the project maintainer merged the proposed changes to the source-code, Bountysource would transfer the money acting as a trustee during the whole process.

== History ==
Bountysource was started in the 2000s and by May 8, 2006, had integrated a new custom-built Subversion browser into the system. On May 11, 2006, Bountysource released their Subversion browser, titled bsSvnBrowser, under the GNU General Public License. The initial idea was to open-source more portions of Bountysource as time went on and the code matured to be a true open-source alternative to the proprietary SourceForge.net. The website was originally written in PHP, but as of March 18, 2006, it switched to Ruby on Rails. Development on Bountysource was stopped in March 2008.

It relaunched as a service using the GitHub-API in 2012 to focus on being a trustee for software development bounties that are collected through PayPal, Bitcoin, and other methods.

In 2017, the company was bought by a cryptocurrency company called CanYa.

In 2020 it was bought by a company named The Blockchain Group, which became the owner on July 1.

As of June 2023, Bountysource appears to have stopped paying bounties to developers with verified claims. The Blockchain Group also appears to have stopped responding to Bountysource users.

In November 2023, the Bountysource parent company announced it had filed for bankruptcy.

As of May 2024, Bountysource website says "The site is temporarily down".

== See also ==
- Kickstarter
- Comparison of crowd funding services
- Business models for open-source software
