= Vanitha Narayanan =

Indian business executive

Vanitha Narayanan is an Indian business executive. She is managing director of the IBM-Verizon relationship. She was the Chairman of IBM India from 2017 to 2018. Prior to that, she served as the managing director of IBM India and regional general manager for India and South Asia.

Narayanan joined IBM in the US in 1987. She has worked in several countries, is a member of IBM's Growth & Transformation Team, and was inducted into the IBM Industry Academy. She led several leadership development and diversity initiatives, and is the executive sponsor for developing the women's leadership pipeline.

Narayanan was chairperson of the American Chamber of Commerce in India from 2015 to 2016, executive council member of NASSCOM, chairperson of NITK Surathkal, and member of the Confederation of Indian Industry.

== Awards and recognition ==
In 2017 Narayanan was named as one of the ‘Most Powerful Women’ by Fortune India and Business Today.

== Education ==
Narayanan has a Masters in Business Administration in Marketing from the University of Madras and a Masters in Business Administration in Information Systems from University of Houston - Magna Cum Laude. Besides, she has a major in liberal arts from Stella Maris College, Chennai.

== Personal life ==
Narayanan lives in the US. She is married and has a daughter and grandchild.
