= Bounty jumper =

Ghost soldiers during the American Civil War

Bounty jumpers were men who enlisted in the Union or Confederate army during the American Civil War only to collect a bounty and then leave. The Enrollment Act of 1863 instituted conscription but allowed individuals to pay a bounty to someone else to fight in their place. Bounty jumpers commonly enlisted numerous times in the army, collecting many bounties in the process.

== Methods ==
Being a bounty jumper was more profitable in the North. A month after the Battle of Fort Sumter the United States Congress passed a law allowing for bounties up to $300. The Confederate government did likewise, starting at $50 and then later in the war increased the bounty to $100. As the US dollar was also worth more than the Confederate dollar ever was, the Northern government had greater luck with bounties and was more likely to have to deal with bounty jumpers. With state and local governments also adding to bounties, the total could amount to $1000, a considerable amount. As the typical Northern private was paid $13 a month, the bonuses were considerable.

Typically, the bounty jumper would desert his unit before arriving on the front lines, traveling to a new area to gain another bounty. One bounty jumper collected at least 32 bounties. Another bounty jumper, John Larney aka "Mollie Matches", claimed to have enlisted and deserted from 93 regiments for bounties.

== Consequences ==
Due to the number of bounty jumpers taking advantage of being substitutes for those drafted, the Confederate Congress withdrew the law making substitutions possible in December 1863.

Not all bounty jumpers successfully left their new unit. During the Battle of Spotsylvania Court House in 1864, one bounty jumper who was a member of the 35th Massachusetts Regiment shouted "Retreat!" causing the entire unit to panic and run back to their earthworks.

A popular place for bounty jumpers to go to was New York City. At one time 3,000 professional bounty jumpers were believed to be in the city. A dozen a day were found in a brief campaign to catch jumpers in February 1863; many were caught while enjoying themselves at a brothel. Toward the end of the war, detective Lafayette Baker captured 183 bounty jumpers in a single day by having an infamous broker named Theodore Allen help him use a fake recruitment office; ironically, Allen eventually ran off to Canada with $50,000 that was intended for capturing the bounty jumpers.

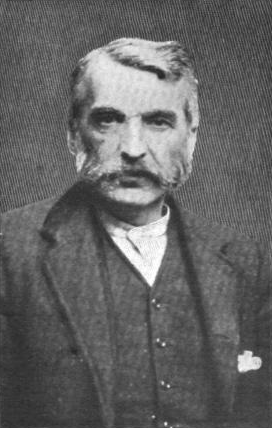
Adam Worth

One bounty jumper became particularly famous. Adam Worth became an international thief, with Thomas Gainsborough's painting Duchess being his most famous acquisition. He would become known as the "Napoleon of Crime", a label Sir Arthur Conan Doyle would borrow when creating the character Professor Moriarty, whom Doyle loosely based on Worth. According to William Pinkerton, Worth did actually fight once, for the Union in the Battle of the Wilderness, and once collected a $30 Confederate bounty, only to eventually fight for the Union. Pinkerton further said that Worth did what he did due to greed and lack of patriotism, not cowardice.

Northerners typically saw bounty jumpers as either "urban, largely foreign underclass" worthy of contempt, or viewed as urban dandies. The view of them as cowardly was generally universal. This wide view allowed Northern authorities to punish bounty jumpers more harshly than other deserters.

== Punishment ==
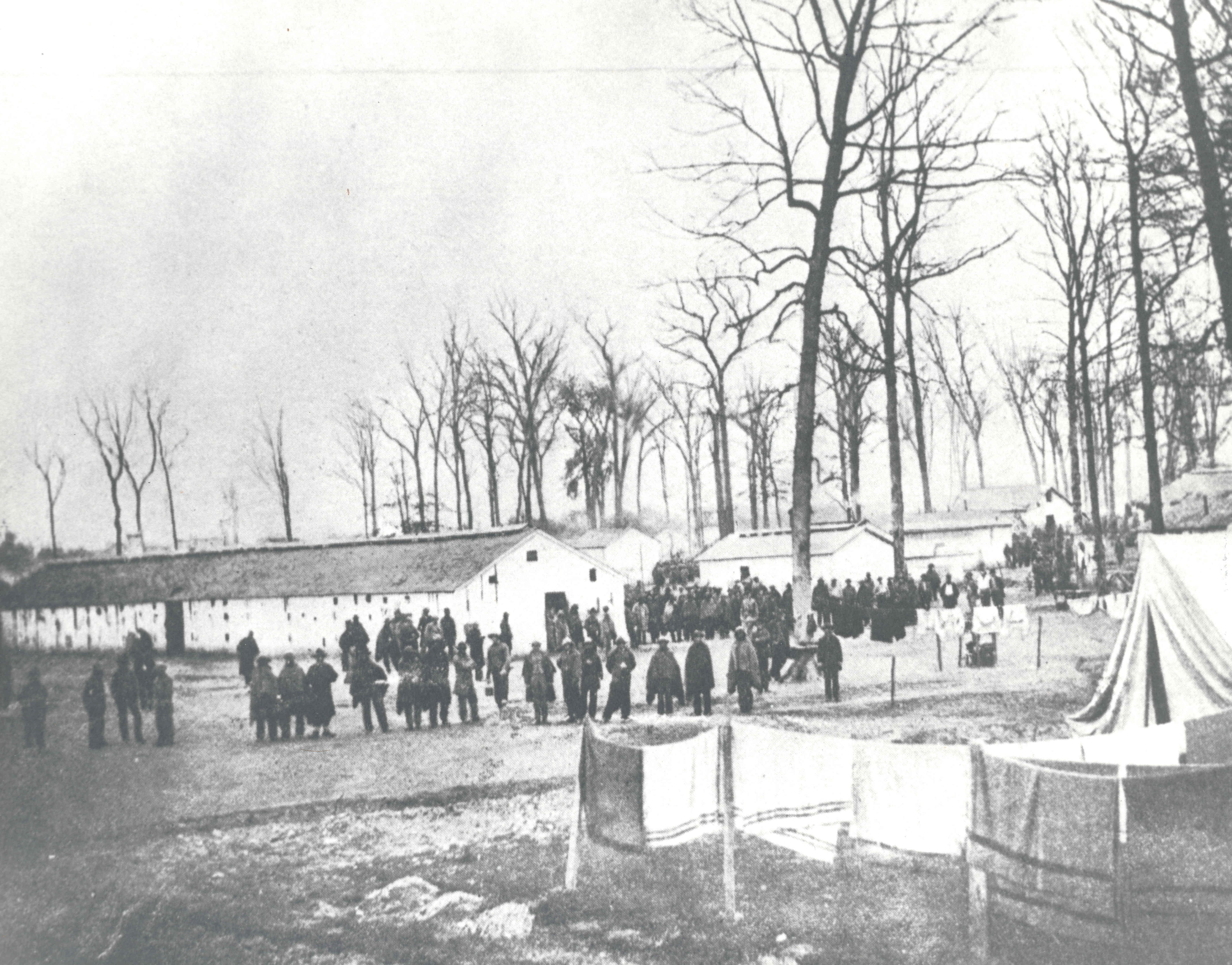
Camp Morton

Bounty jumping could be a capital offense. The most notable execution of bounty jumpers in the Union Army took place at Beverly Ford, Virginia on August 29, 1863. Five bounty jumpers had been recaptured after deserting from the 118th Pennsylvania "Corn Exchange" Regiment and sentenced to death. Appeals were sent all the way to President Lincoln, who decided that the desertion of bounty jumpers was becoming too severe a problem and denied the appeal. The execution of the five deserters took place with the entire V Corps (to which the 118th Pennsylvania belonged) assembled to witness the shooting. In 1864 three bounty jumpers were executed on the parade grounds of Camp Morton in Indianapolis. At Governor's Island in early 1865, bounty jumper James Develin was executed; he had been turned in by his wife after she caught him with another woman. Bounty jumpers were more likely to receive death sentences than those deserters who left due to homesickness, or to help the family farm, or simply as a lark against authority. In another incident, a bounty jumper attempting to escape his captors was shot when one of them overtook him, placing the pistol directly to the back of the man's head while both were running.

Not all punishments were capital. When a man who bounty jumped 32 times was caught, he was sentenced to four years in prison. The infamous Andersonville prison held hundreds of bounty jumpers.

Bounty jumpers also faced torture. One method to torture bounty jumpers was by use of thumbscrews.
