= Adam Worth =

German-born crime boss and fraudster (1844–1902)

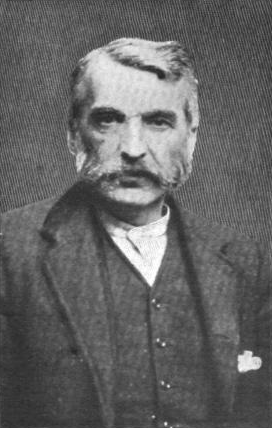
- Born: c. 1844; Germany
- Died: 8 January 1902 (aged 57–58); London, England
- Other names: Henry J. Raymond; Edward Grey; The Napoleon of Crime
- Occupations: Clerk, soldier, thief, gambler, crime boss
- Criminal charges: Robbery
- Penalty: Seven years imprisonment

Adam Worth (c. 1844 – 8 January 1902) was a crime boss and fraudster. His career in crime, stretching from the United States to Europe and southern Africa, included the infamous theft of Gainsborough's celebrated Portrait of Georgiana, Duchess of Devonshire, which he retained for 25 years. In London, he lived as a respected member of high society under the alias Henry Judson (or Harry) Raymond. Scotland Yard Detective Robert Anderson nicknamed him "the Napoleon of the criminal world" based on his short stature. He is widely considered the inspiration for Sir Arthur Conan Doyle's fictional criminal mastermind James Moriarty in the Sherlock Holmes series.

== Early life ==
Adam Worth was born into a poor Jewish family somewhere in Germany. His original surname might have been "Werth". When he was five years old, his family moved to the United States and settled in Cambridge, Massachusetts, where Worth's father became a tailor. In 1854, Worth ran away from home and moved first to Boston and then, in 1860, to New York City. He worked as a clerk in a department store for one month.

When the American Civil War broke out, Worth was 17. He lied about his age and enlisted in the Union army. He was wounded at the Second Battle of Bull Run on 30 August 1862 and shipped to a hospital in Georgetown, Washington, D.C. In the hospital, he learned he had been listed as killed in action and left.

Worth is often confused with Adam Wirth, who served in the 2nd New York Heavy Artilleries, Battery L (later designated 34th New York Battery), died at Georgetown Hospital of wounds he suffered at the Second Battle of Bull Run, and was buried in Washington, D.C. Adam Wirth and his family were residents of College Point, Long Island, New York, and had no connection to Adam Worth.

== Criminal career ==
Worth became a bounty jumper, enlisting into various regiments under assumed names, receiving his bounty, and then deserting. When the Pinkerton Detective Agency began to track him, like many others using similar methods, he fled from New York City and went to Portsmouth, UK.

After the war, Worth became a pickpocket in New York. In time, he founded his own gang of pickpockets, and then began to organise robberies and heists. When he was caught stealing the cash box of an Adams Express wagon, he was sentenced to three years in Sing Sing prison. He soon escaped and resumed his criminal career.

Worth began to work for the prominent fence and criminal organiser Fredericka "Marm" Mandelbaum. With her help, he expanded into bank and store robberies around 1866 and eventually began to plan his own robberies. In 1869, he helped Mandelbaum break safecracker Charley Bullard out of the White Plains Jail, through a tunnel.

With Bullard, Worth robbed the vault of the Boylston National Bank in Boston on 20 November 1869, again through a tunnel, this time from a neighbouring shop. The bank alerted the Pinkertons, who tracked the shipment of trunks Worth and Bullard had used to ship the loot to New York. Worth decided to move to Europe with Bullard.

== Exploits in Europe ==
Bullard and Worth went first to Liverpool. Bullard took the identity of "Charles H. Wells", a Texas oilman. Worth was financier "Henry Judson Raymond", a name that he "borrowed" from the late founder editor of The New York Times, and which he used for years afterwards. They began to compete for the favours of a barmaid named Kitty Flynn, who eventually learned their true identities. She became Bullard's wife, but did not disfavor Worth. In October 1870, Kitty gave birth to a daughter, Lucy Adeleine, and seven years later had another daughter named Katherine Louise. The paternity of these two girls is uncertain. It is possible that Kitty herself did not know, but Bullard and Worth claimed each child all the same. William Pinkerton (son of Allan Pinkerton and a detective with Pinkerton) believed Worth fathered both of Kitty's daughters.

When the Bullards went on their honeymoon, Worth began to rob local pawnshops. He shared the loot with Bullard and Flynn when they came back, and together, the three moved to Paris in 1871.

In Paris, the police force was still in disarray after the events of the Paris Commune. Worth and his associates founded an "American Bar", a restaurant and bar on the ground floor, and a gambling den on the upper floor. Because gambling was illegal, the gambling tables were built so that they could be folded inside the walls and the floor. A buzzer would be sounded from downstairs to alert the customers before any police raid. Worth formed a new gang of associates, including some of his old comrades from New York.

When William Pinkerton visited the place in 1873, Worth recognised him. Later the Paris police raided the place numerous times, and Worth and the Bullards decided to abandon the restaurant. Worth used his place for the last time to defraud a diamond dealer, and the three moved to London.

== London master criminal ==
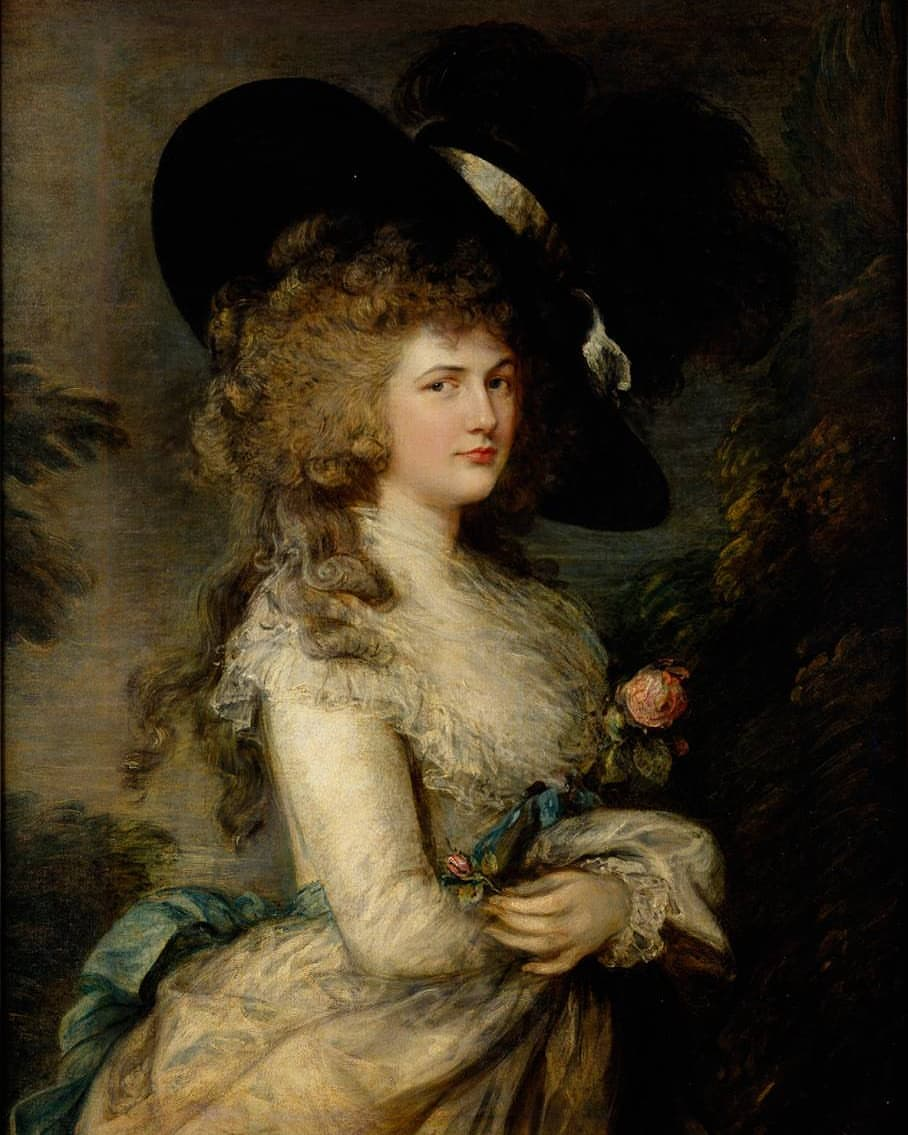
Georgiana, Duchess of Devonshire, by Thomas Gainsborough (1787), stolen by Worth in 1876.

In England, Worth and his associates bought Western Lodge at Clapham Common. He also leased an apartment in Mayfair and joined high society. He formed his own criminal network and organised major robberies and burglaries through several intermediaries. Those who worked in his schemes never knew his name. He insisted that his subordinates not use violence.

Eventually, Scotland Yard learned of Worth's network, though they were initially unable to prove anything. Inspector John Shore made Worth's capture his personal mission.

Things began to go wrong when Worth's brother John was sent to cash a forged check in Paris, for which he was arrested and extradited to England. Worth managed to exonerate him and get him sent back to the United States. Four of his associates were arrested in Istanbul for spreading more forged letters of credit, and he had to use a considerable amount of money to buy off the judges and the police. Bullard became increasingly violent, as his alcoholism worsened, and he eventually left for New York, followed soon afterward by Kitty.

In 1876, Worth personally stole Thomas Gainsborough's recently rediscovered painting of Georgiana Cavendish, Duchess of Devonshire from a London gallery of Thomas Agnew & Sons with the help of two associates. He liked the painting and did not try to sell it. The two men who assisted in the robbery, Junka Phillips and Little Joe, grew impatient. Phillips tried to get him to talk about the theft in the presence of a police informer, and Worth effectively fired him. Worth gave Little Joe money to return to the United States, where he tried to rob the Union Trust Company, was arrested, and talked to the Pinkertons. They alerted Scotland Yard, but they still could not prove anything.

Worth kept the painting with him even when he was travelling and organising new schemes and robberies. Eventually, he travelled to South Africa, where he stole $500,000 worth of uncut diamonds. Back in London, he founded Wynert & Company, which sold diamonds at a lower price than its competitors.

In the 1880s, Worth married a Louise Margaret Boljahn, while still using the name Henry Raymond. They had a son Henry and a daughter Beatrice. It is possible his wife did not know his real identity. He smuggled the painting to the United States and left it there.

== Mistake and capture ==
In 1892, Worth decided to visit Belgium, where Bullard was in jail. Bullard had been working with Max Shinburn (also Maximilian Schönbein), Worth's rival, when police captured them both. Worth had heard that Bullard had recently died.

On 5 October, Worth improvised a robbery of a money delivery cart in Liège with two untried associates, one of them the American Johnny Curtin. The robbery went badly, and the police captured Worth on the spot. The two others got away.

In jail, Worth refused to identify himself, and the Belgian police made inquiries abroad. Both the New York Police Department and Scotland Yard identified him as Worth, although the Pinkertons did not say anything. Max Shinburn, now in jail, told the police everything he knew. In jail, Worth heard nothing about his family in London, but received a letter from Kitty Flynn, who offered to finance his defence.

Worth's trial took place on 20 March 1893. The prosecutor used everything he knew about Worth. Worth flatly denied that he had anything to do with various crimes, saying that the last robbery had been a stupid act he had committed out of a need for money. All the other accusations, including those by British and American police, were mere hearsay. He claimed that his wealth came out of legal gambling. In the end, Worth was sentenced to seven years for robbery and was sent to Leuven Central Prison in Belgium.

During Worth's first year in jail, Shinburn hired other inmates to beat Worth up. Later, Worth heard that Johnny Curtin, who was supposed to have taken care of his wife, had seduced and abandoned her. She had been committed to an asylum. The children were in the care of his brother John in the United States.

== Release and last years ==
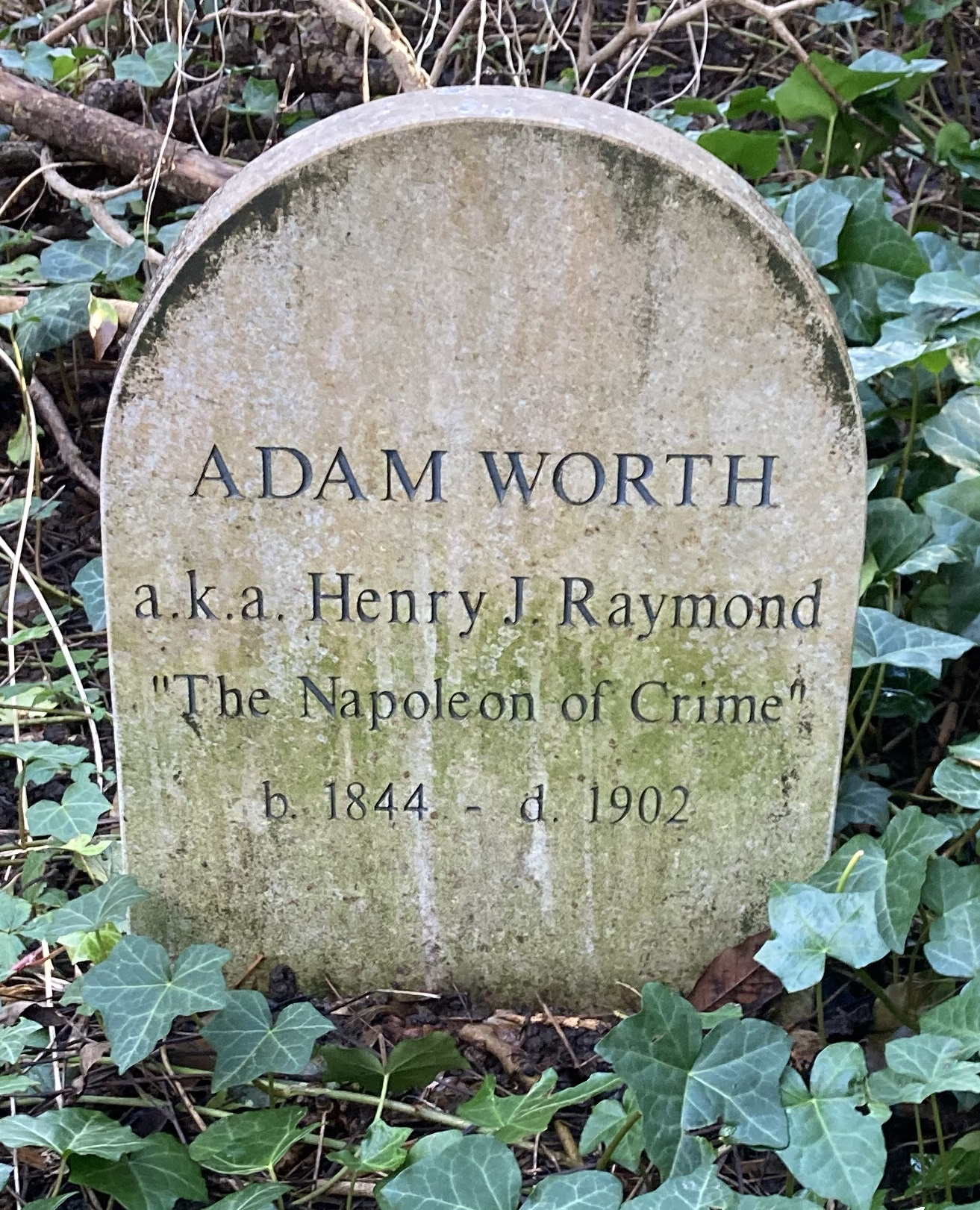
Headstone marking Worth's grave in Highgate Cemetery (west side)

Worth was released early for good behaviour in 1897. He returned to London and stole £4,000 from a diamond shop to get funds. When he visited his wife in the asylum, she barely recognised him. He travelled to New York and visited his children. Then he proceeded to meet with William Pinkerton, to whom he described the events of his life in great detail. The manuscript that Pinkerton wrote after Worth left is still preserved in the archives of the Pinkerton Detective Agency in Van Nuys, California.

Through Pinkerton, Worth arranged the return of the painting Duchess of Devonshire to Agnew & Sons in return for $25,000. The portrait and payment were exchanged in Chicago on 28 March 1901. Worth returned to London with his children and spent the rest of his life with them. It is said he lived "extravagantly on the proceeds of his business as a receiver for an international agency of thieves". His son took advantage of an agreement between his father and William Pinkerton and became a career Pinkerton detective.

Worth died on 8 January 1902. He was buried in Highgate Cemetery in a common grave under the name of "Henry J. Raymond". A small tombstone was erected to mark his resting place in 1997 by the Jewish American Society for Historic Preservation.

== In popular culture ==
According to Vincent Starrett, Sir Arthur Conan Doyle used Worth as the prototype for Sherlock Holmes' adversary, Professor Moriarty: "The original of Moriarty was Adam Worth, who stole the famous Gainsborough, in 1876, and hid it for a quarter of a century. This was revealed by Sir Arthur in conversation with Dr Gray Chandler Briggs, some years ago."

Michael Caine played Worth in the film Harry and Walter Go to New York (1976). Though Worth is correctly portrayed as a criminal mastermind, the events of the story are not based on true events.
