= PHP-Nuke =

Web-based content management system

- Original author: Francisco Burzi
- Initial release: August, 1998
- Stable release: 8.4.5 / October 5, 2022
- Repository: bitbucket.org/phpnuke/phpnuke/
- Written in: PHP
- Operating system: Cross-platform
- Type: Content management system
- License: GNU General Public License
- Website: github.com/phpnuke/phpnuke

PHP-Nuke is a web-based automated news publishing and content management system based on PHP and MySQL originally written by Francisco Burzi. The system is controlled using a web-based user interface. PHP-Nuke was originally a fork of the Thatware news portal system by David Norman.

PHP-Nuke was originally released under the GNU General Public License as free software. Versions after 7.5 required a license fee; from version 8.3 it became free again. This is permitted under the GPL (providing the source code is included), and the purchaser of the software has the right to freely distribute the source code of the product. Burzi no longer owns the PHP-Nuke site.

As of version 5.6, the display of a copyright message on webpages is required in accordance with the GPL section 2(c).

PHP-Nuke requires a web server which supports the PHP extension, as well as an SQL database.

== Features ==
PHP-Nuke is a content management system allowing webmasters to create community-based portals (websites), allowing users and editors to post news items (user-submitted news items are selected by editors) or other types of articles. Registered users can then comment on these articles.

Modules can be added to the PHP-Nuke system allowing additional features such as an Internet forum, Calendar, News Feed, FAQs, Private Messaging and others. The site is maintained through an administration interface.

PHP-Nuke includes the following standard modules:

- Advertising—Manages ads on the page layout (theme). Supports images/links, JavaScript/HTML, and Flash
- Avantgo—Provides mobile versions of the last 10 news articles
- Content—Manages the main content "pages"
- Downloads—Manages file downloads. There are no uploads—it stores links to files on other servers
- Encyclopedia—Manages phrases/words and definitions
- FAQ—Manages Frequently Asked Questions (FAQ)
- Feedback—Communicate to the webmaster. It is an online form, but provides feedback via email.
- Forums—Manages discussion forums for the site. It is based on bb2nuke, which is a PHP-Nuke port of the popular open-source phpBB discussion board.
- Journal—Maintain public and/or private notes
- Members List—Displays site members
- News—Manages news stories, including future-dated news to be released at a specific date and time. Each article can be assigned to a single category.
- Private Messages—Allows members to send private messages to others on the site. Members can prevent messages from other members.
- Recommend Us—Send an email message recommending the site to others.
- Search—Allows users to search your site.
- Statistics—Displays summary and detailed site statistics, including page views.
- Stories (News) Archives—Provides access to older news articles.
- Submit News—Allow visitors to submit news. Email notification is sent, but the submission is stored in the administrator control panel. Administrator can delete, edit, and/or post the article without re-keying.
- Surveys (Polls)—Create visitor surveys
- Top—Displays the most-visited articles, downloads, etc.
- Topics—Displays news by topic. The administrator defines the topics and assigns topics to content.
- Web Links—Manages a hierarchical directory of links to selected websites
- Your Account—Manages members "profile" information, including their preferred theme, the number of news articles to display on their home page, etc.

PHP-Nuke supports many languages and its look and feel can be customized using the Themes system, but major changes requires knowledge of PHP, HTML and CSS.

== Issues ==
Several security holes have been discovered in PHP-Nuke, including SQL injection via unchecked PHP code. PHP-Nuke may have issues with some search engine indexes. PHP-Nuke does not use simple URLs or unique titles for pages.

== License ==
PHP-Nuke is distributed for free and licensed under the GNU/GPL license; however, current versions must be purchased and can then be distributed for free.

== Questionable website ownership change ==
The PHP-Nuke website is now owned by Bibado Investments S.L. which is also a distributor of unwanted programs (adware).
