= Bounty (reward) =

Payment or reward

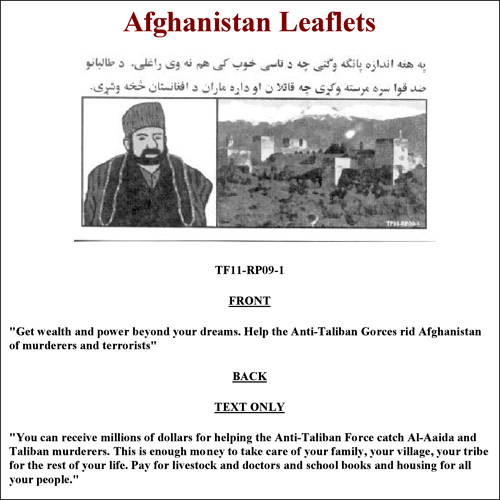
A bounty flyer offering rewards on behalf of the "Anti-Taliban Forces" in Afghanistan

A bounty is a payment or reward of money to locate, capture or kill an outlaw or a wanted person. Two modern examples of bounties are the ones placed for the capture of Saddam Hussein and his sons by the United States government and Microsoft's bounty for computer virus creators. Those who make a living by pursuing bounties are known as bounty hunters.

Bounties have also been granted for other actions, such as exports under mercantilism.

== Examples ==
=== Historical examples ===
Written promises of reward for the capture of or information regarding criminals go back to at least the first-century Roman Empire. Graffiti from Pompeii, a Roman city destroyed by a volcanic eruption in 79 AD, contained this message:

A copper pot went missing from my shop. Anyone who returns it to me will be given 65 bronze coins (sestertii). Twenty more will be given for information leading to the capture of the thief.

A bounty system was used in the American Civil War as an incentive to increase enlistments. Unscrupulous bounty jumpers would receive a bounty, then desert.

Another bounty system was used in New South Wales to increase the number of immigrants from 1832.

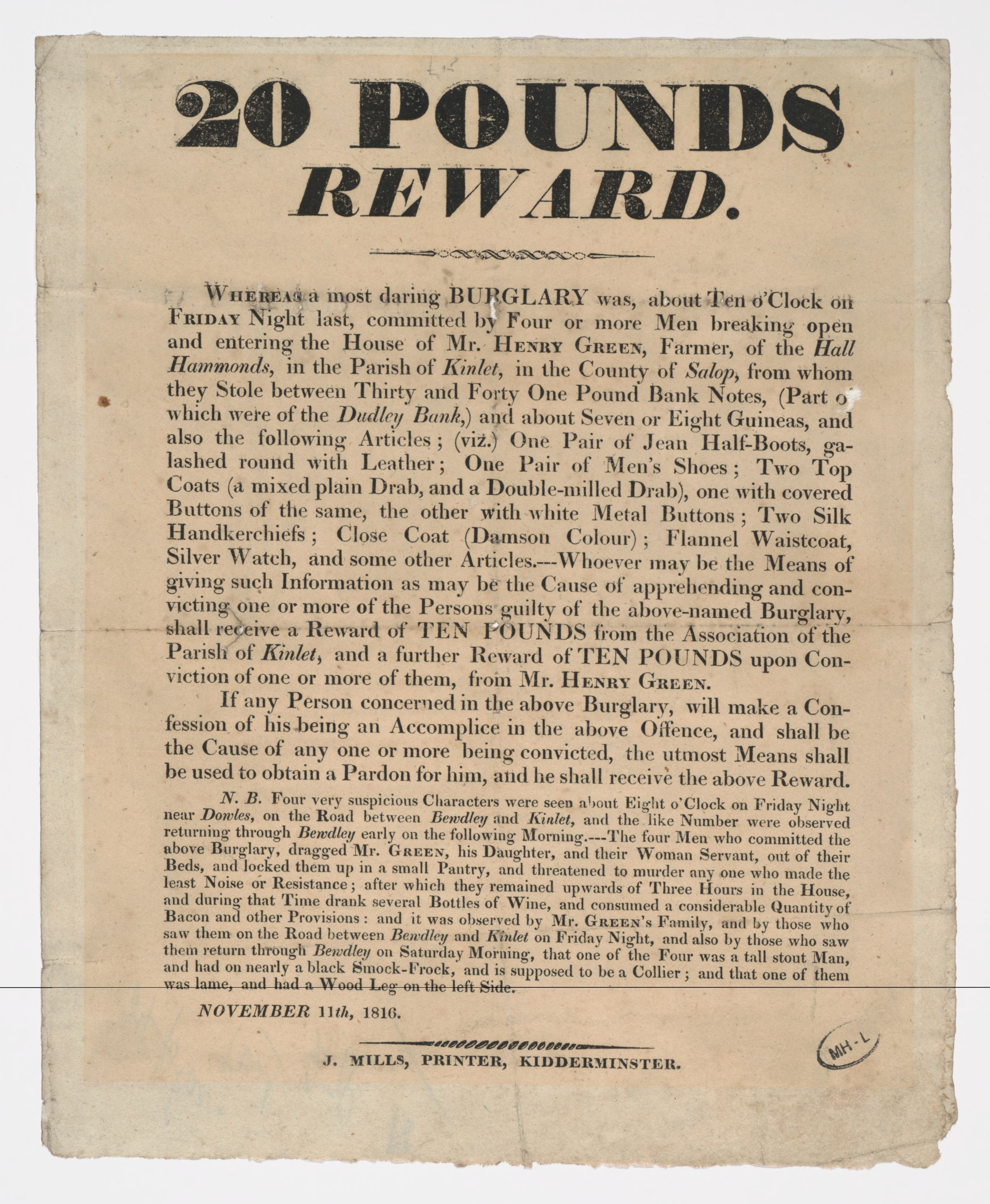
£20 reward offered for information in Kidderminster house burglary, 1816

Bounties were sometimes paid as rewards for killing Native Americans. In 1862, a farmer received a bounty for shooting Taoyateduta (Little Crow). In 1856, Governor Isaac Stevens put a bounty on the head of Indians from eastern Washington, for ordinary Indians and for a chief. A western Washington Indian, Patkanim, chief of the Snohomish, obligingly provided a great many heads, until the territorial auditor put a stop to the practice due to the dubious origins of the deceased.

In Australia in 1824, a bounty of 500 acres (200 ha) of land was offered for capturing alive the Wiradjuri warrior Windradyne, the leader of the Aboriginal resistance movement in the Bathurst Wars. A week after the bounty was offered, the word "alive" was dropped from the reward notices, but he was neither captured nor betrayed by his people.

Bounties have been offered on animals deemed undesirable by particular governments or corporations. In Tasmania, the thylacine was relentlessly hunted to extinction based on such schemes. Gray wolves, too, were extirpated from much of the present United States by bounty hunters. An example of the legal sanction granted can be found in a Massachusetts Bay Colony law dated May 7, 1662: "This Court doth Order, as an encouragement to persons to destroy Woolves, That henceforth every person killing any Woolf, shall be allowed out of the Treasury of that County where such woolf was slain, Twenty shillings, and by the Town Ten shillings, and by the County Treasurer Ten shillings: which the Constable of each Town (on the sight of the ears of such Woolves being cut off) shall pay out of the next County rate, which the Treasurer shall allow."

=== 17th-century examples ===
Since after the Stuart Restoration, criminality was increasing, the dissatisfaction with the penal system led to the implementation of the rewards. £10 were promised to anyone who gave information about a robber or burglar and a pardon was also granted to convicts able to provide evidence against their accomplices. Between 1660 and 1692, Parliament introduced a series of statutes that offered rewards up to £40. Under William III, the rewards became a systematic element in the fight against crime, an alternative to erase the most dangerous threats to the community. The first example of permanent reward was in 1692, when £40 (together with the offender's horse, arms, and money) were offered for the discovery and the conviction of offenders who committed serious property crimes – highway robbery, burglary and housebreaking, coining, and other offences. The trial judges became fundamental to the administration of the rewards system because the statutes put them in charge of apportioning the reward among the persons who claimed to have participated in procuring the conviction. As it was written in the legislation of 1692, "...in case any Dispute shall happen to arise between the persons so apprehending any the said Thieves and Robbers touching their right and title to the said Reward that then the said Judge or Justices so respectively certifying as aforesaid shall in and by their said Certificate direct and appoint the said Reward to be paid unto and amongst the Parties claimeing the same in such share and proportions as to the said Judge or Justices shall seem just and reasonable"

=== 18th-century examples ===
In the 18th century, the English government episodically offered rewards by proclamation; in 1720, a royal proclamation offered bounties for the unmasking of murderers or highway robbers, sometimes worth as much as £100. When a statutory reward overlapped a proclamation, prosecuting or convicting of a highway robber could be worth £140 a head (£100 under proclamation, £40 by statute), £240 for a pair or £420 for a three-person group. These were huge sums at the time when an artisan earned about £20 and a labourer less than £15 per year. Supplementary reward was part of the administration of the law for six years, then with the death of George I, it came to an end. After two years, in February 1728, a new proclamation reinstated the £100 reward by respecting the original terms. Private parties were also free to offer rewards in addition to rewards by proclamations, then this practice was taken up by governmental departments and local authorities. In 1716, Robert Griffith was indicted for stealing from Thomas Brooks, one silver watch, value £51, and one gold watch, value £18, from Mary Smith. She offered a reward of £15 to anyone who gave information about the robber. The reward was received by Mr. Holder, after he brought Mrs. Smith the silver watch that was stolen. In 1732, Henry Carey offered a reward of 2 guineas for the securing of Richard Marshall, and three more for his conviction. Marshall, together with Mary Horsenail and Amy Mason, were indicted for breaking and entering the house of Mr. Carey in Dorrington-street. They were also indicted for robbery. Marshall was secured by Mr. Parker, that received the 2-guinea reward as promised. Australian bushranger Ned Kelly held the most wanted bounty of the 1800s, for £8000; Ned was wanted dead or alive.

=== Rewards and thief-takers ===
In creating incentives to overcome criminality, the rewards system risked overincentivizing. This led to the development of the profession of thief-taker. They were part of the criminal underworld, but they were seen as offering an advantageous service to the state. Victims of theft in London, facilitated by the circulation of newspapers, took advantage of advertising to recover their stolen goods. They offered a reward "with no questions asked". Since prosecutors usually resorted to the legal system, they had to pay for the proceedings at the Old Bailey; though the offender was convicted, they often lost their goods forever. For this reason, prosecutors decided to bypass the legal system, recovering their goods by resorting to advertising. Thief-takers were the perfect intermediates between victims and offenders and received a portion of the reward offered. Jonathan Wild, a prominent figure of the underworld, successfully combined thief-taking with the activity of simplifying the return of stolen goods by paying rewards to the thieves. In the early 1720s, he controlled London's underworld, but his activity became a threat to the community and the integrity of the penal system. In 1725, Wild was accused of stealing 50 yards (46 m) of lace, valued at £40, from the shop of a blind woman, Catherine Statham. He admitted accepting a reward of 10 guineas from Mrs. Statham for helping her to recover the stolen lace. He was acquitted of the first charge but with Mrs. Statham's evidence presented against him on the second charge he was convicted and sentenced to death.

=== Fictional representations ===
The figure of Jonathan Wild inspired the character of Mr. Peachum in The Beggar's Opera, a satirical ballad opera in three acts written in 1728 by John Gay. Peachum controls a large group of thieves, and is connected to the government and courts. Because of these connections, he can decide whether to allow a captured criminal to be hanged (in that case he receives a reward) or to be released. In scene II, Peachum gives evidence against another member of his gang, Tom Gagg, in exchange for a reward of £40. Then in scene IV, Mrs. Peachum, Peachum's wife, enters and inquires about Bob Booty, her favorite member of the gang. Peachum will accept a £40 reward for allowing Bob to be hanged.

Steve McQueen played bounty hunter Josh Randall in the Western television series Wanted Dead or Alive (1958–1961).

The Star Wars universe features many bounty hunters, with the most famous examples being Boba Fett and Din Djarin.

Two films directed by Quentin Tarantino, Django Unchained and The Hateful Eight, focus on the stories of bounty hunters in the United States in the mid to late 1800s.

=== 21st-century examples ===
The majority of prisoners held in Guantánamo Bay detainment camp were handed over by bounty hunters.

The Isabella Stewart Gardner Museum in Boston offered a $5 million reward for the return, in good condition, of the 13 works of art taken from its galleries in March 1990.

== Other uses ==
=== Mathematics ===
The term "bounty" is used in mathematics to refer to a reward offered to any person willing to take on an open problem. Bounties are offered for solving a particular math problem – ranging from small lemmas that graduate students solve in their spare time to some of the world's hardest math problems. Paul Erdős was famous for offering mathematical bounties.

=== Economics ===
In economics the term "bounty" has often been used in the sense of a negative tax.

In Australia, "bounty" was historically used as a term for production subsidies. Section 90 of the Constitution of Australia authorises the federal parliament to grant "bounties on the production or export of goods", while section 91 allows the state parliaments to grant a "bounty on mining for gold, silver, or other metals". The Sugar Bounty Act 1905 made a bounty payable on sugar production (subject to the recipient employing only white labour), while the Bounties Act 1907 "offered bounties for the production of primary products which were currently imported and not produced or produced on a small scale in Australia: vegetable fibres such as flax and jute, rice, rubber, coffee, tobacco leaf, cotton and some dried fruit", but these were discontinued in 1918. Cotton bounties continued into the 1940s, including via the Raw Cotton Bounty Act 1934.

=== Open-source software ===
In the computer science and open-source community, bounty refers to a reward offered to any person or project willing to solve open problems, for instance, implementing a feature or finding a bug in an open-source software program (open-source bounty). For instance, the Mozilla Foundation offers bounties for security bug hunting. Bounty-driven development is one of the business models for open-source software.

Bounties can also be awarded for non-technical contributions, such as for adding relevant information or digital media to a repository. On Wikipedia, one of several ways to incentivize users to expand articles is by offering rewards via the Reward board in exchange for a specified contribution. Bounties on the Reward board are provided by the requesting Wikipedia user and both monetary and non-monetary rewards are permitted. Wikipedia, and other open-source projects, place guidelines on compensation to maintain neutrality and reliability.

=== Poker ===
In poker tournaments, a money bounty is awarded for knocking a player out of the tournament. Some tournaments offer a bounty for any eliminated player, while others offer them only for certain players, usually well-known professional players, sometimes celebrities.

=== Cryptocurrency ===
In cryptocurrency, bounty campaign is a popular marketing tool used widely to support the launch of a new cryptocurrency, new dApp game or a new blockchain platform. In a bounty campaign, participants receive small amounts of cryptocurrency tokens in exchange for providing social media engagement (for instance, tweeting and retweeting) or for creating promotional materials (such as YouTube videos).

=== Motorsport ===
Often, if a driver or team has won multiple consecutive races, a race track or sanctioning body will establish a bounty on a team. This practice is common on local short tracks, especially if a driver has won three consecutive weeks or more. The bounty often is increased for every race the offending driver or team continues to win, and is claimed upon another driver or team ending that winning streak. After Chip Ganassi Racing won six consecutive Rolex Sports Car Series races, Grand American Road Racing Association established a bounty to the team that beats Ganassi. On May 14, 2011, Action Express Racing defeated Ganassi, and claimed the bounty.

After Kyle Busch won six consecutive NASCAR Gander RV & Outdoors Truck Series races over a two-season span, driver Kevin Harvick and series sponsor Camping World Holdings placed a $100,000 bounty to a full-time Cup Series driver that defeats Busch in one of the remaining four races Busch is eligible to participate. Numerous Cup Series drivers announced plans to enter the $100,000 bounty races. On the first race of the four on May 26, 2020, Chase Elliott claimed the bounty in defeating Busch at the North Carolina Education Lottery 200. Harvick and Camping World will donate the bounty to COVID-19 relief efforts. A separate bounty had been planned by Halmar International, a sponsor on a Kyle Busch Motorsports truck, for $50,000 if a Truck Series regular defeated Busch, but that was cancelled because the sponsor used the money for COVID-19 relief efforts.

=== American football ===
Bounties, referring to bonuses for in-game performance, are officially banned by the National Football League, the sport's dominant professional league. Despite this, bounties have had a significant history within the sport. Notable examples include a 1989 game between the Dallas Cowboys and Philadelphia Eagles that became known as the Bounty Bowl, and a bounty scheme organized by players and coaches with the New Orleans Saints that was uncovered in 2012, leading to substantial penalties.

=== Recruitment ===
Bounty is also used to refer to bonus payments made to staff on recruitment (or for recommending others for recruitment). This practice used to be common in the military (it was standard practice in the British Army during the 19th century), but has since been largely phased out, only to become relatively widespread amongst civilian employers. Many reserve armed forces also pay a retention "bounty" to personnel who meet or exceed participation and training thresholds.

== See also ==
- Bounty jumper
- BountySource
- Contract killing
- Bounty hunter
- Inducement prize contest, competition that awards a cash prize for the accomplishment of a feat, usually of engineering
