= OpenForum Europe =

European open standard think tank

OFE
- OpenForum Europe
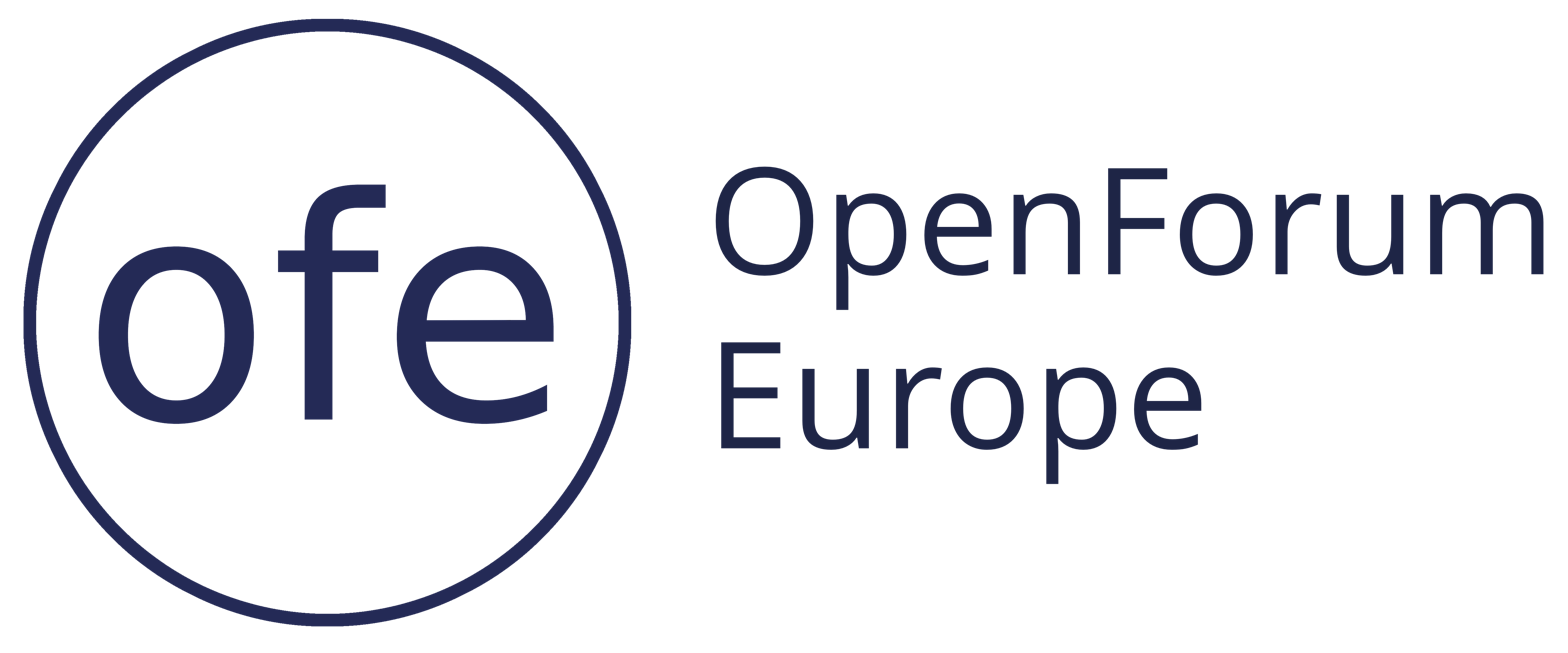
- Established: 2002
- Founders: Graham Taylor, Basil Cousins, Robert Blatchford
- Type: Non-profit Think Tank
- Purpose: Open source software, European Digital policy
- Headquarters: Brussels, Belgium
- Chairperson: Sachiko Muto
- Executive Director: Laszlo Igneczi
- Website: www.openforumeurope.org

OpenForum Europe (OFE) is a European open source software and open standard not-for-profit think tank. Its key objective is to contribute to achieve an open and competitive digital ecosystem in Europe. Based in Brussels, it launched its operations in 2002 and conducts research on topics such as open source, open standards, digital government, public procurement, intellectual property, cloud computing and Internet policy. Founded by Graham Taylor, Basil Cousins and Robert Blatchford, the current executive director is Laszlo Igneczi.

== Activities ==
OFE is a registered interest group with the European Commission and the European Parliament. OFE advises European policymakers and legislators on the merits of openness in computing and provides technical analysis and explanation. OFE promotes open source software, as well as openness more generally, as part of a vision to facilitate open, competitive choice for technology users.

OFE works closely with the European Commission, European Parliament, national and local governments both directly and via its national partners. It follows five openness objectives to help direct its work: user centricity, competition, flexibility, sustainability, and community.

== Economic impact of open source software ==
In 2021, OFE, in collaboration with Fraunhofer ISI, conducted a study on the impact of open source software and hardware on technological independence, competitiveness, and innovation in Europe for the European Commission.

== The EU Open Source Policy Summit ==
Since 2015, OFE has organised the EU Open Source Policy Summit. Started as a workshop with a few people, its 2022 edition gathered 600 participants and 38 speakers. Topics covered during sessions at the summit have included the public sector's capacity for open source, open source software security, the economics of open source, and supporting the green transition through open source solutions.

== OpenForum Academy ==
OpenForum Academy is an independent programme established by OpenForum Europe with the aim to create a link between academics and policymakers. In order to provide new input and insight into the key issues which impact the openness of the IT market, the programme gathers researchers from various countries.
