= Linux Technology Center =

IBM Linux development department

The IBM Linux Technology Center (LTC) is an organization focused on development for the Linux kernel and related open-source software projects. In 1999, IBM created the LTC to combine its software developers interested in Linux and other open-source software into a single organization. Much of the LTC's early effort was focused on making "all of its server platforms Linux friendly." The LTC collaborated with the Linux community to make Linux run optimally on processor architectures such as x86, mainframe, PowerPC, and Power ISA. In recent years, the focus of the LTC has expanded to include several other open source initiatives.

With about 185 IBM employees working for the LTC in 1999, this number grew steadily to about 600 in 2006, 300 of whom worked full-time on Linux. In December 2000, IBM claimed to have invested approximately one billion US dollars in Linux by the year 2000, and to currently have about 1,500 developers working on the alternative operating system. It announced that it would invest a similar amount in 2001 and also build the largest Linux-based supercomputer for Royal Dutch/Shell Oil. While most of the money was invested in Linux development, some of it went into others, mainly AIX. The following year, senior vice president Bill Zeitler claimed to have recouped most of this spending in the first year through the sale of software and systems.

== Details ==
Developers in the LTC contribute to various open-source projects such as:

- Kernel-based Virtual Machine (KVM) on x86 and Power systems, including Kimchi
- Apache Hadoop
- OpenStack
- OpenPOWER Foundation
- GNU toolchain
- Open source standards

LTC is a worldwide team with main locations in Australia, Brazil, China, Germany, India, Israel, and the United States.
