= Fraunhofer Institute for Systems and Innovation Research =

Scientific research institute in Germany

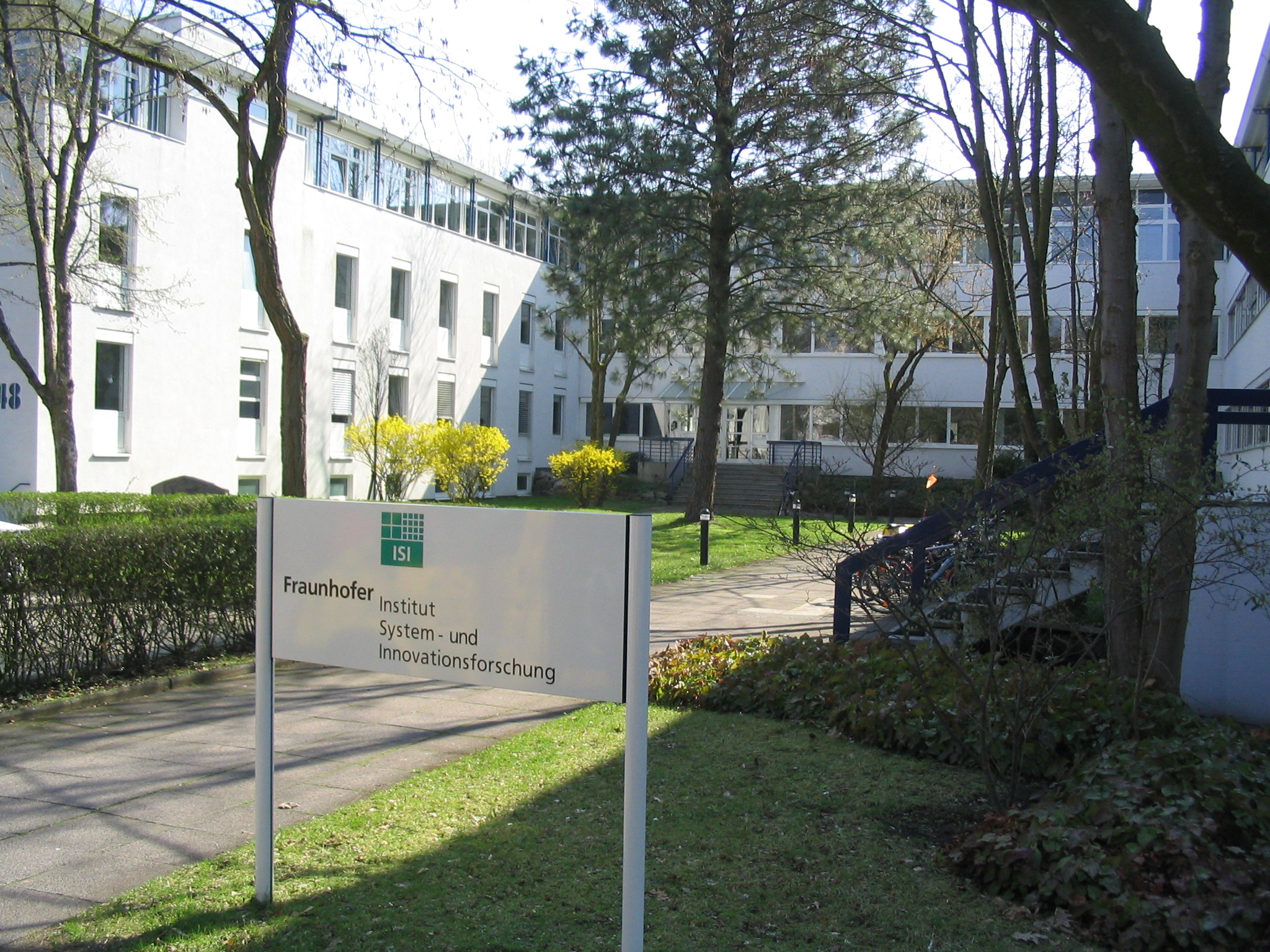
- The Fraunhofer ISI in Karlsruhe
- Other name: German: Fraunhofer-Institut für System- und Innovationsforschung; Fraunhofer ISI
- Parent institution: Fraunhofer-Gesellschaft
- Founder: Helmar Krupp (in German)
- Established: 1 April 1972; 54 years ago
- Focus: Applied research into foresight; policy consultation; emerging technologies; innovation research; energy research
- Executive Director: Jakob Edler
- Staff: c. 270
- Budget: €27.4 million (as of 2020)
- Formerly called: Fraunhofer Institute for System Technology and Innovation Research in Karlsruhe
- Location: Karlsruhe, Baden-Württemberg, Germany
- Coordinates: 49°1′40.1″N 8°26′29.4″E
- Interactive map of Fraunhofer Institute for Systems and Innovation Research
- Website: isi.fraunhofer.de/en.html

The Fraunhofer Institute for Systems and Innovation Research (German: Fraunhofer-Institut für System- und Innovationsforschung), known as the Fraunhofer ISI, is a research institute of the Fraunhofer Society based in Karlsruhe, Baden-Württemberg, Germany. It conducts applied research and development of innovation in engineering, economics, the natural and social sciences. The Fraunhofer ISI is one of the leading institutes for innovation research in Europe.

== History ==
At the beginning of 1972, the innovation researcher Helmar Krupp (de) recommended that the natural science and technology-oriented Fraunhofer Society should found a new institute to research the impacts and potentials of technologies and innovations. This recommendation was followed on 1 April 1972 with the establishment of the Fraunhofer Institute for System Technology and Innovation Research in Karlsruhe – under Helmar Krupp as its director. Frieder Meyer-Krahmer (de) took over as director from 1990. Under his management, the institute became one of the internationally leading innovation research institutes. This resulted in it being renamed "Fraunhofer Institute for Systems and Innovation Research" in 2004 because "System Technology" was no longer considered suitable for the institute that had since grown to well over 100 employees.

In 2005, Meyer-Krahmer was appointed State Secretary of the German Federal Ministry of Education and Marion Weissenberger-Eibl (de) has been the director of Fraunhofer ISI since April 2007. Under her leadership, futures research became a core competence at the institute. In 2007, the institute was restructured and its individual departments were turned into competence centers with specialized business units. The energy transition and new mobility and transport concepts have resulted in Fraunhofer ISI's continued growth. Fraunhofer ISI conducts research in seven competence centers.

On 1 October 2018 Fraunhofer ISI expanded its management team with the appointment of Prof. Jakob Edler. As a professor of innovation policy and strategy, Edler was previously a director at the Manchester Institute of Innovation Research. Appointed as executive director, Edler contributes his expertise in the governance and policy of international research and innovation initiatives.

== Research interests ==
In seven competence centers (CC), Fraunhofer ISI researches the origins, applications, opportunities and risks as well as the markets for innovative technical developments. Particular attention is paid to exploring the impacts of these innovations on the economy, the state and society and providing a basis for decision-making in academia, industry and politics.

=== Energy Policy and Energy Markets ===
The CC Energy Policy and Energy Markets researches the implementation of a political and institutional framework for a sustainable energy system. As renewable energies and climate protection technologies advance, this CC evaluates energy and climate policy measures, strategies and instruments in order to provide decision-makers with a better picture of the future energy market. The Business Units are Renewable Energies, Energy Policy, Climate Policy, Electricity Markets and Infrastructures as well as Global Sustainable Energy Transitions.

=== Energy Technology and Energy Systems ===
The CC Energy Technology and Energy Systems analyzes emerging technologies that can contribute to a sustainable energy system. Its five Business Units Energy Efficiency, Energy Economy, Demand Analyses and Projections, Demand Response and Smart Grids as well as Actors and Acceptance in the Transformation of the Energy System focus on the efficient and sensible use of energy and analyzing the impacts on the economy and society.

=== Foresight ===
The CC Foresight uses scientific methods to look ahead into the future. To support industry, society and politics, the CC conducts research on alternative future scenarios, the developments of long-term objectives, future strategies and technology changes in its Business Units Futures and Society, Futures Dialogs, and Foresight for Strategy Development.

=== Innovation and Knowledge Economy ===
The CC Innovation and Knowledge Economy analyses the prerequisites for innovations and their effects from the company level up to national innovation systems. It explores the various institutions, instruments and strategies in the economy and science that generate new knowledge and innovations. This happens in the Business Units Industrial Change and New Business Models, Innovation Trends and Science Studies, and Competitiveness and Innovation Measurement.

=== Sustainability and Infrastructure Systems ===
Taking into account ecological, political, economic and social aspects, the CC Sustainability and Infrastructure Systems conducts research on innovations that foster the decoupling of economic growth and environmental pollution. The research focus ranges from individual new products up to long-term developments in industrialized and developing countries. The four Business Units are Water Resources Management, Sustainability Innovation and Policy, Raw Materials, and Mobility.

=== Emerging Technologies ===
The CC Emerging Technologies is concerned with the analysis of new technologies and socio-technical transformations. It examines the changes resulting from the interplay between technologies, innovations and society. Communication and an interdisciplinary perspective are essential for the research conducted. The Business Units Bioeconomy and Life Sciences, Innovations in the Health System, Information and Communication Technologies, and Industrial Technologies contribute to the respective scientific discourses.

=== Policy and Society ===
Research and innovation are increasingly called upon to contribute to overcoming societal challenges. The CC Policy and Society examines the resulting requirements for research and innovation systems, as well as for the design of a research, technology and innovation policy committed to sustainability and societal well-being and its coordination with other policy fields. This happens in the Business Units Policy for Innovation and Transformation, Societal Change and Innovation, Regional Innovation Dynamics and Knowledge Exchange, and Innovation and Regulation.

== Cooperation ==
Among others, the institute cooperates with the Karlsruhe Institute of Technology, Leibnitz University of Hannover and the University of Kassel in Germany and, internationally, with the University of Strasbourg (Bureau d'Economie Théorique et Appliqué), ETH Zurich (Centre for Energy Policy and Economics), the Institute of Policy and Management at the Chinese Academy of Sciences (Beijing), Virginia Tech (Blacksburg) and the School of Public Policy at the Georgia Institute of Technology (Atlanta) and Manchester Institute of Innovation Research (MIoIR), Fraunhofer ISI is also a member of numerous programs, networks and advisory committees.

== Infrastructure ==
Fraunhofer ISI employs approximately 270 permanent members of staff, who work on about 400 research projects each year. Sixty percent of these employees are scientists. According to the institute's own figures, in 2020 its annual budget amounted to approximately €27.4 million. Approximately forty percent of its contracts come from the German government; another thirty percent from the European Union; and approximately twenty percent are from industry – both companies and industrial associations.
