= Upstream and downstream =

Upstream and downstream can refer to:

== Molecular biology ==
- Upstream and downstream (DNA), determining relative positions on DNA
- Upstream and downstream (transduction) determining temporal and mechanistic order of cellular and molecular events of signal transduction

== Computer science ==
- Upstream and Downstream, the notional directions which lie "towards" and "away from" the author of a piece of software, relative to the speaker

== See also ==
- Upstream (disambiguation)
- Downstream (disambiguation)
