= Open coopetition =

In R&D management and systems development, open coopetition or open-coopetition is a neologism to describe cooperation among competitors in the open-source arena. The term was first coined by the scholars Jose Teixeira and Tingting Lin to describe how rival firms that, while competing with similar products in the same markets, cooperate which each other in the development of open-source projects (e.g., Apple, Samsung, Google, Nokia) in the co-development of WebKit. More recently, open coopetition started also being used also to refer to strategic approaches where competing organizations collaborate on open innovation initiatives while maintaining their competitive market positions.

Open-coopetition is a compound-word term bridging coopetition and open-source. Coopetition refers to a paradoxical relationship between two or more actors simultaneously involved in cooperative and competitive interactions; and open-source both as a development method that emphasizes transparency and collaboration, and as a "private-collective" innovation model with features both from the private investment and collective action — firms contribute towards the creation of public goods while giving up associated intellectual property rights such patents, copyright, licenses, or trade secrets.

Situating open-coopetition in practice

By exploring coopetition in the particular context of open-source, Open-coopetition emphasizes transparency on the co-development of technological artifacts that become available to the public under an open-source license—allowing anyone to freely obtain, study, modify and redistribute them. Within open-coopetition, development transparency and sense of community are maximized; while the managerial control and IP enforcement are minimized. Open-coopetitive relationships are paradoxical as the core managerial concepts of property, contract and price play an outlier role.

The openness characteristic of open-source projects also distinguishes open-coopetition from other forms of cooperative arrangements by its inclusiveness: Everybody can contribute. Users or other contributors do not need to hold a supplier contract or sign a legal intellectual property arrangement to contribute. Moreover, neither to be a member of a particular firm or affiliated with a particular joint venture or consortia to be able to contribute. In the words of Massimo Banzi, "You don't need anyone's permission to make something great".

More recently open-coopetition is used to describe open-innovation among competitors more broadly with many cases out of the software industry. While some authors use open-coopetition to emphasize the production of open-source software among competitors, others use open-coopetition to emphasis open-innovation among competitors.

== History ==
=== 2008 ===
In a large-scale study involving multiple European-based software intensive firms, the scholars Pär Ågerfalk and Brian Fitzgerald revealed a shift from "open-source as a community of individual developers to open-source as a community of commercial organizations, primarily small and medium-sized enterprises, operating as a symbiotic ecosystem in a spirit of coopetition". Even if they were exploring open-sourcing as "a novel and unconventional approach to global sourcing and coopetition", they captured the following quote that highlights that competition in the open-source arena is not as in business as usual.

"In a traditional market you don't call up your competitor and be like, oh, well tell me what your stuff does. But in open source you do." [Open Source Program Director, at IONA]

=== 2012 ===
Also in the academic world, and after following a software company based in Norway for over five years, and while theorizing on the concept of software ecosystem, the academic Geir K. Hanssen noted that the characteristic networks of a software ecosystem, open-source or proprietary ones, can embed competing organizations.

"Software ecosystems have a networked character. CSoft and its external environment constitute a network of customers and third party organizations. Even competitors may be considered a part of this network, although this aspect has not been studied in particular here."

In an opinion article entitled Open Source Coopetition Fueled by Linux Foundation Growth, the journalist and market analyst Jay Lyman highlights that "working with direct rivals may have been unthinkable 10 years ago, but Linux, open-source and organizations such as the Linux Foundation have highlighted how solving common problems and easing customer pain and friction in using and choosing different technologies can truly drive innovation and traction in the market." The term "open source coopetition" was employed to highlight the role of the Linux Foundation as a mediator of collaboration among rival firms.

=== 2013 ===
At the OpenStack summit in Hong Kong, the co-founder of Mirantis Boris Renski talked about his job on figuring out how to co-opete in the crowded OpenStack open-source community. In a 43-minute broadcast video, Boris Renski shed some light on OpenStack coopetition politics and shared a subjective view on strategies of individual players within the OpenStack community (e.g., Rackspace, Mirantis, IBM, HP and Red Hat among others). The Mirantis co-founder provided a rich description of an open-source community working in co-opetition.

Along with this lines, the pioneering scholarly work of Germonprez et al. (2013) reported on how key business actors within the financial services industry that traditionally viewed open-source software with skepticism, tied up an open-source ‘community of competitors’. By taking the case of OpenMAMA, a Middleware Agnostic Messaging API used by some of the world's largest financial players, they show that corporate market rivals (e.g., J. P. Morgan, Bank of America, IBM and BMC) can coexist in open-source communities, and intentionally coordinate activities or mutual benefits in precise, market focused, and non-differentiating engagements. Their work pointed out that high-competitive capital-oriented industries do not epitomize the traditional and grassroots idea that open-source software was originally born from. Furthermore, they argued that open-source communities can be deliberately designed to include competing vendors and customers under neutral institutional structures (e.g., foundations and steering committees).

=== 2014 ===
In an academic paper entitled "Collaboration in the open-source arena: The WebKit case", the scholars Jose Teixeira and Tingting Lin executed an ethnographic informed social network analysis on the development of the WebKit open-source web browsing technologies. Among a set of the reported findings, they pointed out that even if Apple and Samsung were involved in expensive patent wars in the courts at the time, they still collaborated in the open-source arena. As some of the research results did not confirm prior research in coopetition, the authors proposed and coined the "open-coopetition" term while emphasizing the openness of collaborating with competitors in the open-source arena.

=== 2015 ===
By turning to OpenStack, the scholars Teixeira et al. (2015) went further and modeled and analyzed both collaborative and competitive networks from the OpenStack open-source project (a large and complex cloud computing infrastructure for big data). Somewhat surprising results point out that competition for the same revenue model (i.e., operating conflicting business models) does not necessarily affect collaboration within the OpenStack ecosystem—in other words, competition among firms did not significantly influence collaboration among software developers affiliated with them. Furthermore, the expected social tendency of developers to work with developers from same firm (i.e., homophily) did not hold within the OpenStack ecosystem. The case of OpenStack revealed to be much about genuine collaboration in software development besides ubiquitous competition among the firms that produce and use the software.

=== 2016 ===
A related study by Linåker et al. (2016) analyzed the Apache Hadoop ecosystem in a quantitative longitudinal case study to investigate changing stakeholder influence and collaboration patterns. They found that the collaborative network had a quite stable number of network components (i.e., number of sub-communities within the community) with many unconnected stakeholders. Furthermore, such components were dominated by a core set of stakeholders that engaged in most of the collaborative relationships. As in OpenStack, there was much cooperation among competing and non-competing actors within the Apache Hadoop ecosystem—or in other words, firms with competing business models collaborate as openly as non-rivaling firms. Finally, they also argued that the openness of software ecosystems decreases the distance to competitors within the same ecosystem, it becomes possible and important to track what the competitors do within. Knowing about their existing collaborations, contributions, and interests in specific features offer valuable information about the competitors’ strategies and tactics.

In a study addressing coopetition in the cloud computing industry, Teixeira et al. analyzed not only coopetition among individuals and organizations but also among cohesive inter-organizational networks. Relationships among individuals were modeled and visualized in 2D longitudinal visualizations and relationships among inter-organizational networks (e.g., alliances, consortium or ecosystem) were modeled and visualized in 3D longitudinal visualizations. The author added evidence to prior research suggesting that competition is a multi-level phenomenon that is influenced by individual-level, organizational-level, and network-level factors.

Coopetition among individuals affiliated with firms in the OpenStack software ecosystem

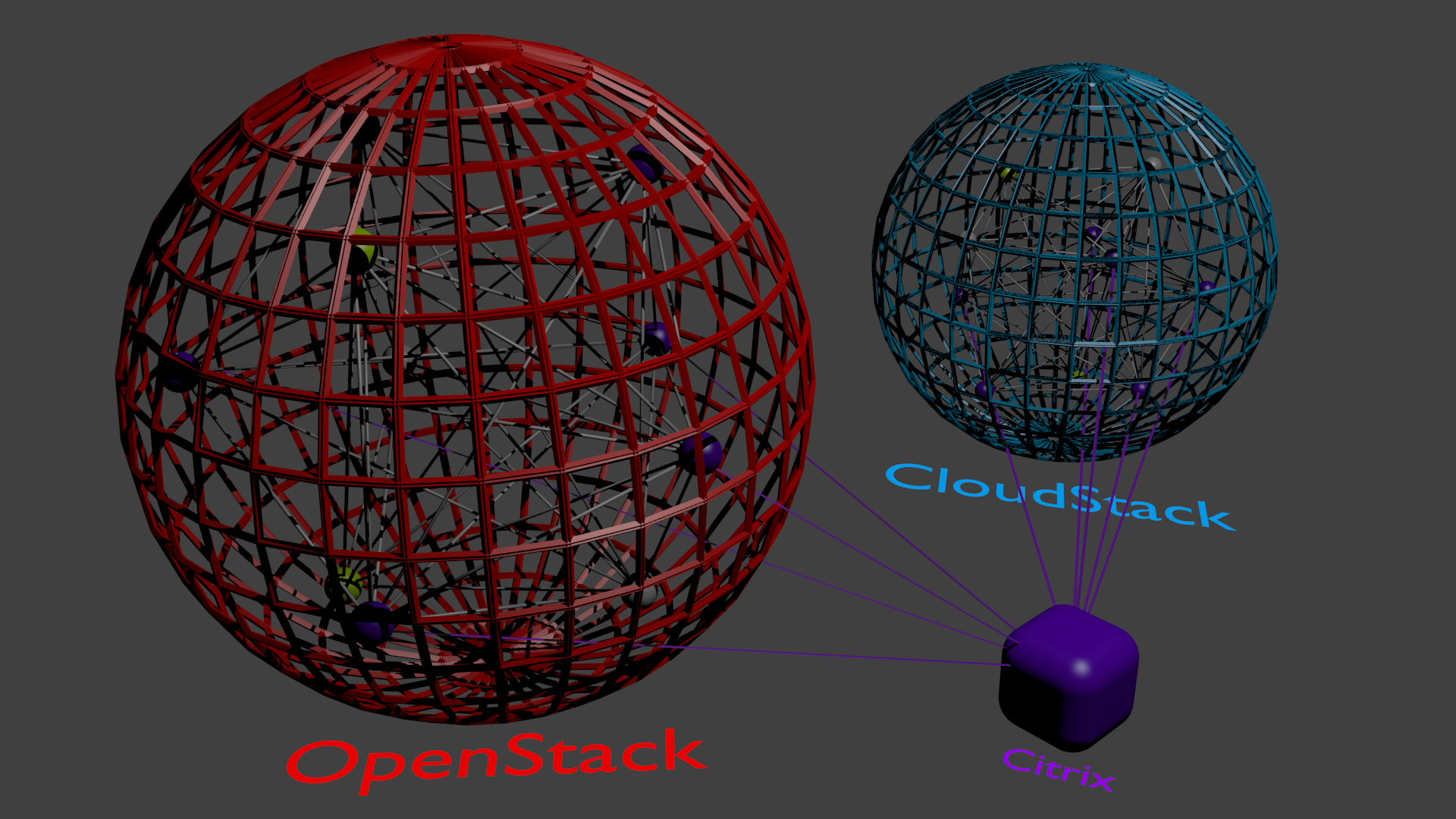
Coopetition among a dyad of software ecosystems

By noting that many firms engaging into open-coopetition actively manage multiple portfolios of alliances in the software industry (i.e., many strategically contribute to multiple open-source software ecosystems) and by analyzing the co-evolution of OpenStack and the CloudStack cloud computing platforms, the same authors propose that development transparency and the weak intellectual property rights, two well-known characteristics of open-source ecosystems, allow an easier transfer of information and resources from one alliance to another. Even if openness enables a focal firm to transfer information and resources more easily between multiple alliances, such 'ease of transfer' should not be seen as a source of competitive advantage as competitors can do the same.

=== 2017 ===
In a study explicitly addressing coopetition in open-source software ecosystems, Nguyen Duc et al. (2017) identified a number of situations in which different actors within the software ecosystem deal with collaborative-competitive issues:

- Central actors that act as a bridge between the community and the companies contributing to it (e.g., a lead developer or a maintainer) need to act as gatekeepers (aka boundary spanners) for bugs reported against specific products sold by the participating firms. As the software is integrated downstream into specific products often sold by competing firms, it matters to sort out what bugs are the responsibility of a specific firm or the community as a whole. In parallel, such 'bridging' actors also act as gatekeepers in flows of code and information (e.g., what code should, or should not, be included in the official community-releases and what information should circulate among the ecosystem participants).
- Contributors affiliated with firms need to balance the interests of their employers with the interests of the community as a whole. Therefore, their work encompasses the filtering of what is to be kept private (hidden and/or property of the firm) or what is to be open (transparent and publicly available under the open-source community terms). Such filtering is impacted by many factors that can range from technical, legal, bureaucratic, as well as organizational strategy issues. .

Competitive behavior within open-source software ecosystems frictions with the more purist view of free and open-source software. The same authors reported on some working practices that conflict with the more traditional values of free and open-source software.

- Developers occasionally establish private communication channels. Some open-source purists would prefer that all communication remains transparent and publicly available to the overall community.
- Developers limit sensitive information to certain partners. While purists would prefer all relevant information to remain available to all ecosystem participants, legal or security issues are often discussed in private and secure communication channels.

The same study also unfolded a number of benefits that organization can rip by actively contributing to open-source software ecosystems that encompass both cooperative and competitive relationships:

- Keeping the differences between their packaged software and the upstream software to a minimum. This allows firms to more easily benefit from the newest developments in the community. By implementing an upstream first policy, organizations can more easily catch updates, fixes, and changes from upstream.
- Sharing maintenance responsibilities. Organizations working only downstream (i.e., just taking the software without contributing back) become solely responsible for maintaining their solution without the benefit of the overall community.
- Reducing maintenance costs by revealing their own developments. If organizations extensively modify the software and opt to close some parts (keep it private or obfuscated) they will need to maintain such closed parts by themselves in the future without the benefit of the overall community.
- Faster integration of new contributions. Active contributors will get their work integrated upstream more easily due to an improved social position within the community.
- Receiving help. Active contributors with an improved social position within the community are more likely to benefit from the help from others members in the community. Given the complex nature of software development, help from other members in the ecosystem can be very valuable.
- A sense of friendly competitiveness. Besides being competitors, the ecosystem participants develop a sense of community. Developers employed by competing firms can perceive others as partners and/or friends rather than competitors. In their work, developers often think of others as developers, partners or colleagues (individual persons) over the firms that they are representing.
- Mutual co-creation of value. Even if many of competing firms are competitors they are often also customers/suppliers of each other. Furthermore, they might be competing in different geographical areas or different business domains creating a heterogeneous and heterophilous environment for reciprocal learning and value co-creation. Given the complex nature of software development, value creation should benefit from the involvement of multiple and heterogeneous actors holding complementary skills and resources.

=== 2018 ===
In the last chapter of book dedicated to coopetition strategies, scholars Frédéric Le Roy and Henry Chesbrough developed the concept of open-coopetition by combining insights from both the open innovation and coopetition literatures. They departed from open-coopetition in the specific realm of open-source software to the more broader context of open innovation among competitors. Their work defines open-coopetition as "open innovation between competitors including collaboration", outline key success factors of open innovation based on collaboration with a competitors, and calls for further research on the topic.

=== 2019 ===
While proposing a research agenda for open-coopetion, Roth et al. (2019) argued that there is no need to narrow the concept of open coopetition to the software industry. More broadly, they redefined the concept as "simultaneously collaborative and competitive open innovation between competitors and third parties such as networks, platforms, communities or ecosystems". Furthermore, they also argued that open-coopetition not only takes place in a growing number of industries but also constitutes both a management challenge at the individual or inter-firm level and as an organizing principle of many regional or national innovation systems. While prior work explored open-coopetition among individuals, firms, platforms and ecosystems, Roth et al. (2019) discussed open-coopetition among Public–private partnerships and the Triple helix model of innovation that relies on the interactions refers to a set of interactions between academia (the university), industry and government.

=== 2020 ===
An editorial review of a special issue on "coopetition strategies" pointed out the popularity of the open-coopetition strategy among firms. The scholars pinpointed that from a strategic management perspective "it seems very important to know why, how and for which outcomes they follow this kind of strategy".

=== 2021 ===
A Finnish policy white paper entitled "From Industry X to Industry 6.0" by Business Finland, pointed out that "open-coopetiton" requires new mindsets, changes in operating methods, and new orchestration needs. This is perhaps the first time that the term "open-coopetition" is referred within a public policy document.

=== 2022 ===
A doctoral dissertation entitled "Innovating Innovation Management in the Medical Device SME Sector Through Coopetition" defended by Dirk Dembski on August 2022, at Sheffield Hallam University, UK, explored the applicability of open-source coopetition in the highly regulated medical devices european market characterized by intense and evolving regulations. Although the term "open-coopetition" is not explicitly used, some of the presented qualitative evidence probed the applicability of open-source in the european medical device industry. On the one hand, these SMEs recognize the value that open-source model could bring to work with others (including competitors). On the other hand, they are "unwilling" or "not ready" to share their algorithms.

=== 2023 ===
Empirical work investigating open-coopetition in the automotive industry by Jose Teixeira suggested that cooperating with competitors in the open-source arena is not only about saving money but also about saving time.

"they jump over the overheads costs related to sourcing software in the traditional way that can involve long negotiations, formulation of legal contracts, and stipulation of diverse intellectual property arrangements (e.g., patents and copyrights issues, distribution and end-user licensing agreements as well as non-disclosure agreements)."

The same author also pointed out the practical benefits of open-source software and reduction of duplication efforts in both production and maintenance of software. Furthermore, the inclusiveness and openness of open-source software projects encourages contributions from enthusiasts, students, hackers, and academics.

The same author also suggested industrial convergence and increased competition as antecedents of open-coopetition.

"As software becomes increasingly important, auto-makers fear the convergence with the software industry. In an era where cars are 1) increasingly powered by software in general and open-source software in particular, 2) connect to other mobile products such as smart-phones and tablets, and 3) integrate with a number of digital services (e.g., navigation, assistance, and entertainment), new entrants in the automobile industry, especially software-savvy organizations such as Apple and Google, can challenge the established players."

=== 2024 ===
Ghislain de Vergnette, director of Product and Marketing at GOODSID, announced a new product that aimed “to integrate a variety of solutions, whether complementary or competing, in a spirit of open coopetition.” - this is perhaps one of the first times that the open coopetition term is used within the context of startups. The launching of a new product in the “spirit of open coopetition” emphasised the openness of their technology and their openness to the integration of their product with competing others

=== 2025 ===
Published in April 2025, a study by Osborne et al. examined the phenomenon of open-coopetition within company-hosted open source software projects. It focused specifically on prominent artificial intelligence frameworks such as PyTorch, TensorFlow, and Hugging Face Transformers. The research provided several new insights into the structure and dynamics of corporate collaboration in open source environments, particularly when compared to projects governed by neutral foundations. The study found that host companies were responsible for the majority of code contributions, typically accounting for around 80% of commits. However, the structure of collaboration networks varied between projects: PyTorch displayed a more decentralized pattern prior to its transition to the Linux Foundation, TensorFlow operated with a hub-and-spoke model centered on Google, and Transformers exhibited a hybrid structure. These differences highlighted how company-hosted projects can foster distinct collaboration dynamics compared to those managed by foundations, which often enforce more balanced governance. The same authors also identified three primary types of corporate collaboration within these projects: strategic (aligned with core business objectives, such as hardware-software optimization), non-strategic (general maintenance activities like bug fixing), and contractual (formal partnerships, such as cloud service integrations). The study noted that AI-specific projects often involved unique technical collaborations not commonly found in other open source domains. A key finding of the research was the presence of power imbalances in single-vendor governance models. Host companies maintained unilateral control over project roadmaps, decision-making, and licensing, which could limit the influence of external contributors and increase the risks associated with project forking. This contrasted with foundation-hosted projects, where governance structures are typically designed to balance the interests of multiple stakeholders. Overall, the study contributed to the understanding of open source co-opetition by highlighting both the domain-specific and generalizable patterns of collaboration and governance in company-hosted open source software projects, particularly within the fast-evolving field of artificial intelligence. They found that prior theory regarding the key coordinating role of gatekeepers, the strategic use of the fork as a competitive mechanism, and non-competitive attitudes among individuals developers from rival companies generalized to the three open-source AI projects. However, the extent of generalization varied across the three cases.

One the same year, and adding to prior work on open and coopetitive AI projects, a related study by Jose Teixeira et al. also investigated the TensorFlow open-source platform. The research suggests that open-sourcing can create strategic value despite the loss of intellectual property. They argued that while firms give up intellectual property by open-sourcing, they can expand markets, driving demand for complementary products and services. The findings also suggest that companies may be "forced" to engage in open-coopetition to protect their market share.

The same author pointed out implications for executives, policy makers and AI makers:

Roles	Implications	Examples
Executives	Face a trade-off between overall market growth potential or safeguarding their market share with intellectual property.	Should Google keep its Google Brain innovations in-house or push them so that the overall AI market would create complementary demand?
Policy Makers	Should understand how open-coopetition can accelerate innovation more inclusively.	Should we emphasize IP in the production of AI innovations or foment the democratization of AI innovations?
AI Makers	Open-sourcing is often a competitive necessity rather than a choice.	If Intel, AMD, or ARM would not work with each other in the co-production of TensorFlow (i.e., to optimize their chip-sets for the training of models with TensorFlow), then Nvidia will sell even more silicon.

=== 2026 ===
In a 2026 study investigating inter-organizational collaboration among five large, open-source and coopetitive software ecosystems - the JavaScript libraries React and Vue.js, the front-end framework Bootstrap, the machine learning framework TensorFlow, and the UI toolkit Flutter - Schreiber and Wieland (2026) found that collaboration between competing firms in open-source software (OSS) ecosystems is a key driver of innovation, allowing companies to pool resources and share knowledge to develop more robust projects, creating mutual benefits that reinforce the value of participation.

"The collaborative efforts among competing companies within the OSS ecosystem enhance innovation by combining diverse expertise and resources. This collective approach leads to the development of more robust and versatile OSS projects. Organizations benefit mutually from these collaborations, gaining access to shared knowledge and advancements that would be challenging to achieve independently. This mutual benefit reinforces the value of contributing to OSS ecosystems."

The same study also gave force to prior research that the contributions from large corporations "are not only extensive but also strategically positioned to influence the direction of OSS projects". When juxtaposing collaborative ties vs. coopetitive ties across projects, Schreiber and Wieland (2026) argued that collaborative ties differ from typical collaborative ties in several ways:

- "They exhibit higher multiplexity, often extending beyond code to documentation, issue tracking, and community engagement."
- "They tend to form more persistent and stable connections over time."
- "They show low reciprocity asymmetry, meaning that contributions are more balanced compared to peripheral-to-core collaborations."

Also importantly, the same author also theorize on the outcomes of coopetition in an open-source way in across the 5 analyzed large open-source project:

"Firms appear to leverage open-source projects as neutral platforms where pre-competitive collaboration can take place, lowering development costs, shaping standards, and accessing shared talent pools."

Finally, it the same study enumerated a number characteristics of coopetition in open-source ecosystems:

"coopetition in OSS ecosystems is a stable and structured phenomenon, characterized by strong, balanced, and persistent ties between otherwise competing organizations. This underscores the role of OSS as a coordination mechanism beyond traditional firm boundaries, enabling innovation without central control."

== Cases ==
Cases of open coopetition are common in the software industry in general. Some cases also occur in the electronics, semiconductors, automotive, financial, telecommunications, retail, education, healthcare, defense, aerospace, and additive manufacturing industries. Cases of open coopetition are often associated with high-tech corporations and startups based in the USA (mostly on the West Coast). Cases can be also recognized in Cuba, Brazil, Europe (predominantly on Western Europe), India, South-Korea, China, Vietnam, Australia, and Japan.

Many of the software projects encompassing open coopetition are legally governed by foundations such as the Linux Foundation, the Free Software Foundation, the Apache Software Foundation, the Eclipse Foundation, the Cloud Native Computing Foundation, and the X.Org Foundation among many others. Most of the Linux Foundation collaborative projects are coopetitive in nature: the Linux Foundation claims to be "a neutral home for collaborative development". Furthermore, many coopetitive open-source projects dealing with both software and hardware (e.g., computer graphics, data storage) are bounded by standard organizations such as the Khronos Group, W3C and the Open Compute Project.

=== Software-intensive domains ===
Project	Project domain	Competing actors collaborating in the project network
WebKit	Web browsing technologies	Apple, Nokia, Google, Samsung, Adobe, Intel, BlackBerry
Blink	Web browsing technologies	Google, Opera, Adobe, Intel, Samsung
Django	Web development framework	JetBrains, Instagram, Zapier
Ruby on Rails	Web development framework	Basecamp, GitHub, You Need a Budget (YNAB)
Bootstrap	Front-end web development framework	Twitter, GitHub, Adobe, Google, Orange
React	Front-end web development framework	Meta (Facebook), Microsoft, Airbnb, Netflix, Shopify, Discord
Vue.js	Front-end web development framework	Alibaba, GitLab, Atlassian, Adobe, Google, Baidu
Selenium	Software-testing framework for web applications	BrowserStack, Sauce Labs, New Relic
Flutter (software)	Cross-platform software development kit	Google, Alibaba, Baidu, Toyota, ByteDance
Qt (software)	Cross-platform software development kit	The Qt Company, KDE, Intel, Nokia, IBM, Google, AMD, Siemens
ScaLAPACK	Heterogeneous High-performance computing technologies	Oak Ridge National Laboratory, National Energy Research Scientific Computing Center, University of Tennessee, University of California, Berkeley, NAG Ltd., Intel, IBM, Cray, Hitachi, NEC, Silicon Graphics International
Open MPI	Heterogeneous High-performance computing technologies	University of Tennessee, Los Alamos National Laboratory, Indiana University, University of Stuttgart, Amazon, ARM, AMD, Broadcom, Cisco, Facebook, Intel, Nvidia
OpenStack	Cloud computing infrastructure	Rackspace, Red Hat, Canonical, IBM, HP, Intel, AMD, VMware, Citrix
CloudStack	Cloud computing infrastructure	Citrix
OpenNebula	Cloud computing infrastructure	OpenNebula Systems, Université catholique de Louvain, Ghent University, Trinity College Dublin, Harvard University, Polytechnic José Antonio Echeverría
Cloud Foundry	Platform as a service (PaaS)	Cisco, Canonical, IBM, EMC, VMware, SAP
Xen	Virtualization and hypervisor technologies	University of Cambridge, Citrix, IBM, Intel, HP, Novell, Red Hat, Oracle
Kubernetes	container orchestration technologies	Google, Rancher Labs, CoreOS, Univa, IBM, Red Hat, Docker, Inc.
Docker	OS-level virtualization and containerization technologies	Docker, Inc., Cisco, Google, Huawei, IBM, Microsoft, Stratoscale and Red Hat
Hadoop	Distributed storage and distributed processing technologies for Big Data	Cloudera, Yahoo!, Facebook, Twitter, LinkedIn, Jive, Microsoft, Intel, Hortonworks
Apache Spark	Distributed processing technologies for Big Data	Databricks, Microsoft, University of Michigan, UC Berkeley, Princeton University, Yahoo, Hortonworks, Cloudera, NTT Data, Alibaba, IBM, Intel
GCC	Compiler	Vrije Universiteit Amsterdam, Massachusetts Institute of Technology, University of California, Lawrence Livermore National Laboratory, Oracle, Sun Microsystems, Dell, EMC Corporation, IBM, RedHat, Intel, AMD, ARM, BNP Paribas, INRIA, Facebook, Apple, Google
LLVM	Compiler	University of Illinois at Urbana–Champaign, Apple, Google, Sony Interactive Entertainment, Facebook, Qualcomm, ARM, Intel
Linux	The Linux operating system	Fujitsu, HP, IBM, Intel, NEC, Oracle, Qualcomm, Samsung, Hitachi, Red Hat
Yocto project	Development tools for embedded Linux (focus on architecture independence)	Broadcom, AMD, LG, Renesas, Huawei, Texas Instruments, MontaVista, Wind River, Intel, Freescale, Dell
Linaro	Development tools for embedded Linux (focus on the ARM, HSA architectures)	ARM, Freescale Semiconductor, IBM, Samsung, ST-Ericsson, Texas Instruments
Eclipse	Integrated development environment for JAVA and other programming languages	Actuate, CA, IBM, Google, Oracle, SAP, Red Hat
AOMedia	Media compression technologies	Amazon, Apple, ARM, Cisco, Facebook, Google, IBM, Intel, Microsoft, Mozilla, Netflix, Nvidia
Mesa 3D	3D graphics library	Intel, AMD, VMware
Blender	3D computer graphics software	Blender Foundation, Google, NASA, Valve, Sony Interactive Entertainment, Aleph Objects, Nvidia, Intel, AMD
EdX	Massive open online courses	Massachusetts Institute of Technology, Harvard University, Stanford University, Arizona State University, EdX
Khan Academy	Massive open online courses	Carlos Slim Foundation, Google, AT&T, Disney, Pixar Animation Studios
POLHN	Massive open online courses	WHO, Medscape, Lippincott Williams & Wilkins, Penn Foster Career School, Fiji National University
OpenEMR	Electronic health records and medical practice management software	OpenEMR.pro, Synitech, Z&H Healthcare Solutions, and MedicusTek
VistA	Electronic health records and medical practice management software	InterSystems, Google, PwC
Samba	Application layer for network services	SUSE, Red Hat, Google, Microsoft
WSO2	Middleware integration technologies	IBM, Axiata, Yenlo
RabbitMQ	Message broker for message-oriented middleware	VMware, Pivotal Software
IoTivity	Interoperable device-to-device technologies for the Internet of things	Microsoft, Intel, Qualcomm, Samsung, Cisco, General Electric, Electrolux
AllJoyn	Interoperable device-to-device technologies for the Internet of things	Haier, LG Electronics, Panasonic, Qualcomm, Sharp, Silicon Image, TP-LINK, Cisco, D-Link, HTC, Wilocity
Monax	Blockchain technologies	Monax, Ethereum
OpenDaylight	Software-defined networking platform	Arista Networks, Big Switch Networks, Brocade, Cisco, Citrix, Ericsson, HP, IBM, Juniper Networks, Microsoft, NEC, Red Hat, VMware
Open Platform for NFV (OPNFV)	Platform for network functions virtualization	AT&T, Brocade Communications Systems, China Mobile, Cisco, Dell, Ericsson, HP, Huawei, IBM, Intel, Juniper Networks, NEC, Nokia Networks, NTT DoCoMo, Red Hat, Telecom Italia, Vodafone
Kamailio	VoIP telephony systems	Fraunhofer, Tekelec
Wireshark	Network protocol analyzer	Apple, Cisco, NetApp, Eindhoven University of Technology, Rice University
TensorFlow	Machine learning platform for deep learning neural networks	Google, Dropbox, Airbus, ARM, Qualcomm, Airbnb, Uber, Deepmind and JD.com
PyTorch	Machine learning platform for deep learning neural networks	Meta, Microsoft, NVIDIA, AMD, AWS, Google, IBM, Intel, Hugging Face and OpenAI
Hugging Face transformers	Machine learning platform for deep learning neural networks	Meta Platforms, Google, Microsoft, Nvidia, AWS, IBM, Intel, Hugging Face, OpenAI, Tesla
R Consortium	Programming language and software environment for statistical computing	Microsoft, RStudio, Tibco, Alteryx, Google, HP

=== Beyond software ===
Project	Project domain	Competing actors collaborating in the project network
OpenRISC	Microprocessor design	Flextronics, FOSSi, Jennic, Cadence, Accellera, TechEdSat, NASA, Royal Institute of Technology (KTH), Technical University of Munich (TUM), others
OpenSPARC	Microprocessor design	Oracle, Sun Microsystems, SPARC International, Fujitsu, Ericsson, Cobham plc, European Space Agency, others.
RISC-V	Microprocessor design	Bluespec, Google, Microsemi, NVIDIA, NXP, University of California, Berkeley, Western Digital, others.
Open Compute	Hardware and software designs for data-centers	Facebook, Intel, Google, Apple, Microsoft, Rackspace, Ericsson, Cisco, Juniper Networks, HP, Lenovo, Fidelity, Goldman Sachs, Bank of America, others
OpenCL	Programming framework for heterogeneous computing environments	Altera, AMD, Apple, ARM, Creative, IBM, Intel, Nvidia, Qualcomm, Samsung, others
Open Handset Alliance	Mobile devices platform	Google, Asus, LG, Samsung, HTC, Acer, Huawei, ZTE, Lenovo, NEC, Sharp, others
Tizen	Mobile devices platform	Fujitsu, Huawei, NEC, Casio, Panasonic, Samsung, others
GENIVI Alliance	In-Vehicle Infotainment (IVI) platform	Volvo, BMW, Honda, Hyundai, Renault, PSA, Daimler AG (Mercedes-Benz), Mitsubishi Electric, Bosch, others
Open Automotive Alliance	In-Vehicle Infotainment (IVI) platform	Audi, General Motors, Honda, Hyundai, Google, Nvidia, Freescale Semiconductor, Harman, JVC Kenwood, others
Automotive Grade Linux	Software stack for the connected car	Jaguar Land Rover, Nissan, Toyota, Denso, Fujitsu, Harman, Nvidia, Renesas, Samsung, Texas Instruments, others
SmartDeviceLink	Smartphone to vehicle head unit interface	Ford, Toyota, Suzuki, Mazda, Subaru, Kawasaki, Magellan, Pioneer, others
RepRap	3D printing technologies	University of Bath, MakerBot, Ultimaker, Prusa Research, others
Arduino	Microcontroller board	Arduino, SparkFun Electronics, Adafruit Industries, Interaction Design Institute Ivrea, University of Los Andes, New York University, MIT Media Lab, others
KiCad	Software suite for Electronic Design Automation (EDA)	Université Grenoble Alpes, CERN, Raspberry Pi Foundation, Arduino

== Types of open coopetition ==
Type	Description	Related literature
Open-source coopetition	"Cooperation among competitors in the open-source arena".	
Coopetiton in open-innovation networks	"Open-innovation between competitors and third parties"	
Strategic	"aligned with core business objectives"	
Non strategic	"general maintenance activities"	
Contractual	"formal partnerships"	

== See also ==
- Co-Opetition: A Revolution Mindset That Combines Competition and Cooperation
