= Downstream =

Downstream may refer to:

- Downstream (hydrology), the direction towards the mouth of a stream, i.e. the direction the current flows
- Downstream (bioprocess), when a cell mass from an upstream process (isolated, grown and harvested) is further processed to meet purity and quality requirements
- Downstream (manufacturing), processes which occur later on in a production sequence or production line
- Downstream (networking), data sent from a network service provider to a customer
- Downstream (software development), direction away from the original authors or maintainers of software
- Downstream (petroleum industry), oil and gas industry sector concerned with refining, processing and purifying, as well as consumer marketing and distribution of products
- Downstream (DNA), the direction of an RNA molecule based on its 3' relative position of genetic code
- Downstream (transduction), direction of cell signals opposite to that which are triggered by the binding of signal molecules (receptors)

== In entertainment ==
- Downstream (novella), a novella by Joris-Karl Huysmans
- Downstream (1929 film), a British film by Giuseppe Guarino
- Downstream (2010 film), an action science fiction film
- "Downstream" (Land of the Lost), an episode of the 1974 series '"Land of the lost"
- Downstream (album), an album by New Monsoon
- "Downstream", a song by Supertramp from Even in the Quietest Moments
- "Downstream", a song by American Head Charge from The Feeding
- "Downstream", a track written by Shira Kammen that was part of the Braid soundtrack

== See also ==
- Upstream (disambiguation)
