= Upstream =

Upstream may refer to:

- Upstream (hydrology), the direction towards the source of a stream (against the direction of flow)
- Upstream (bioprocess), part of therapeutic cell manufacturing processes from early cell isolation and cultivation until final harvest
- Upstream (film), a 1927 film by John Ford
- Upstream (networking), direction in which data can be transferred from the client to the server (uploading)
- Upstream (newspaper), a newspaper covering the oil and gas industry
- Upstream (petroleum industry), sector of the oil and gas industry concerned with searching, exploratory drilling, and well operation
- Upstream (software development), direction towards the original authors or maintainers of software
- Upstream (streaming service), a Philippine digital over-the-top streaming service
- Upstream (DNA), the direction of an RNA molecule based on its 5' relative position of genetic code
- Upstream (transduction), direction of cell signals which are triggered by the binding of signal molecules (receptors)
- Upstream collection, a set of NSA internet surveillance programs

== See also ==
- Upstream server
- Up the River (disambiguation)
- Downstream (disambiguation)
