= NS-2000 =

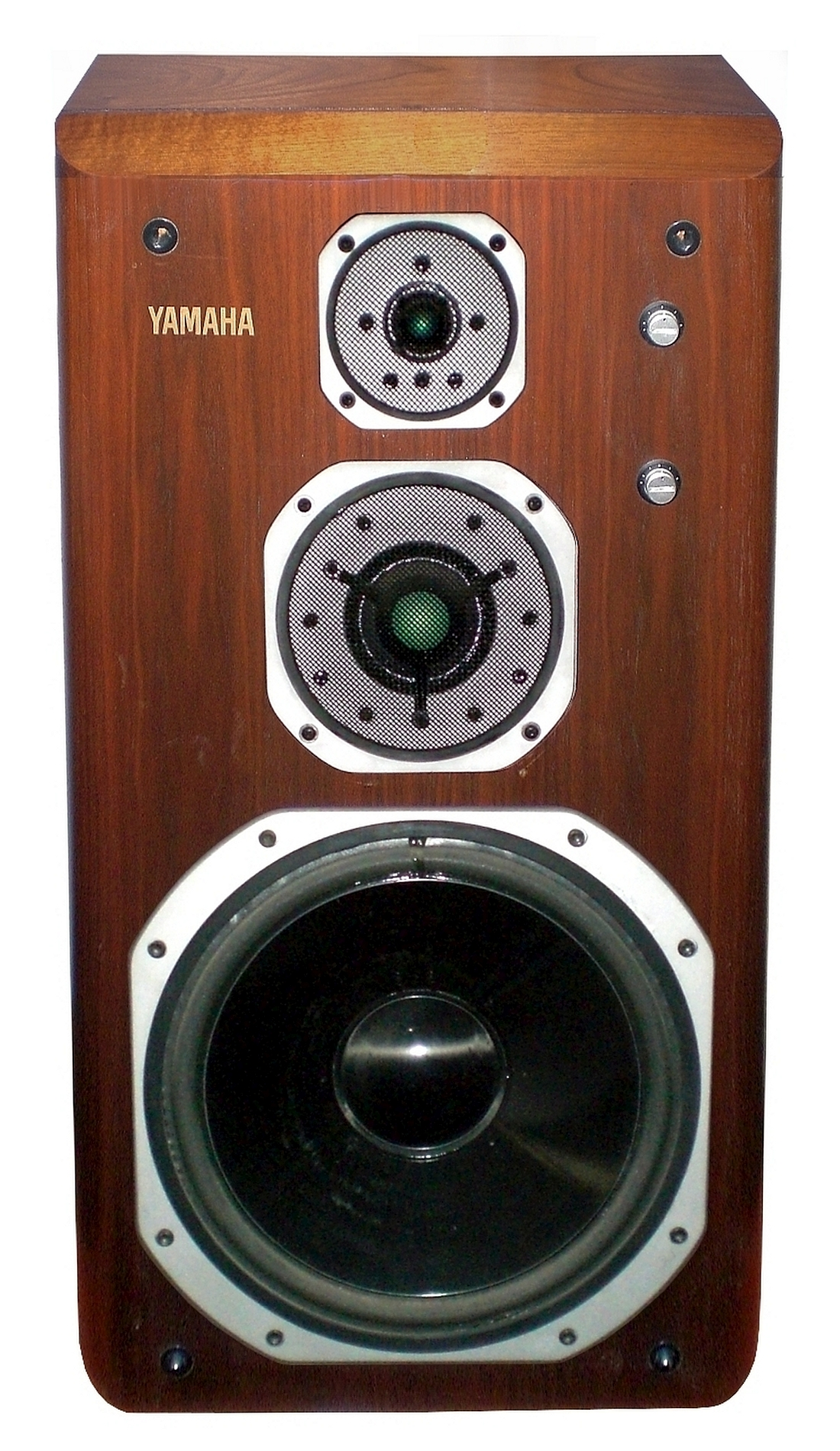
Yamaha NS-2000 Speaker, front view.

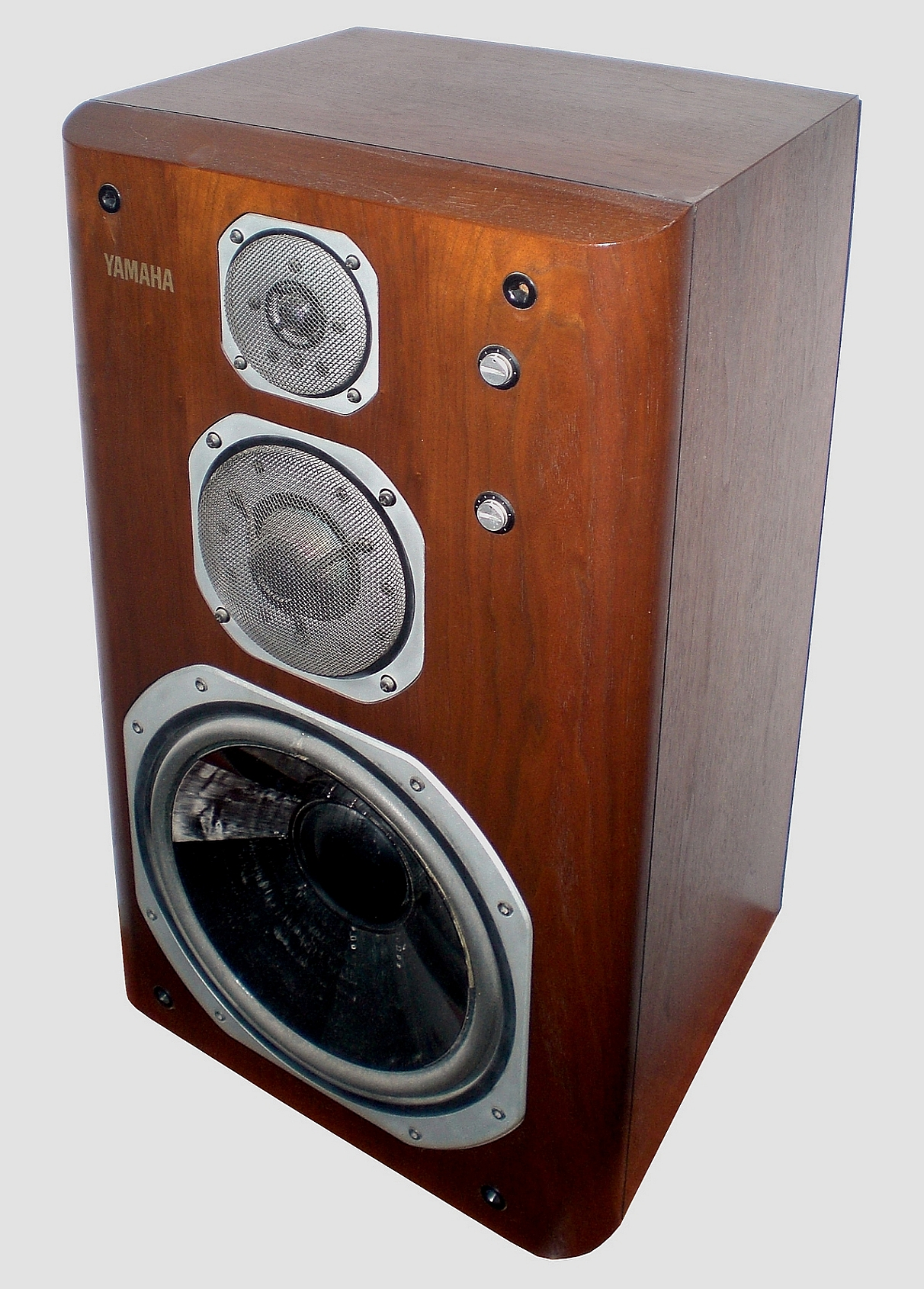
Yamaha NS-2000 Speaker, front top right view.

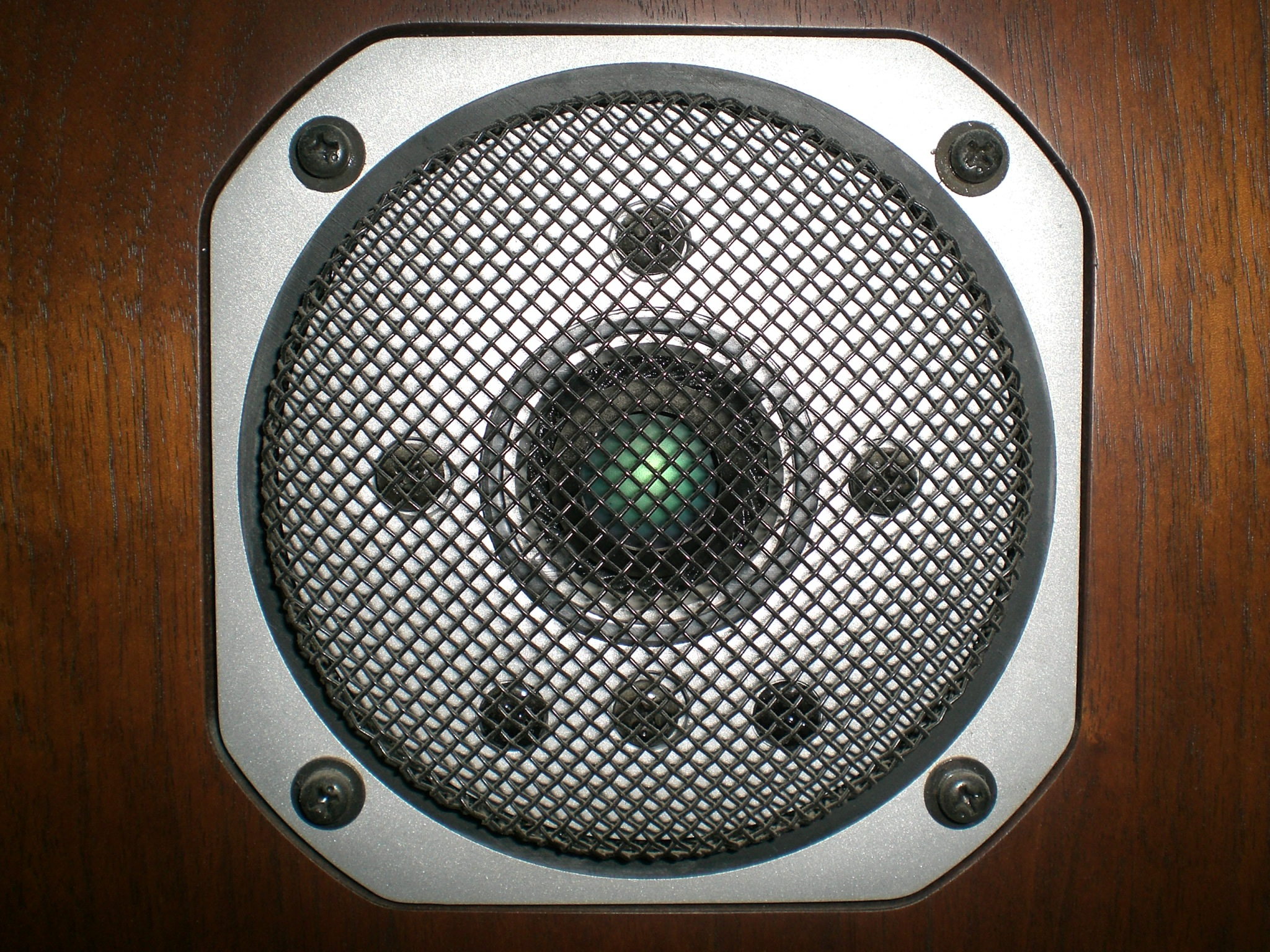
Yamaha NS-2000 Speaker, tweeter.

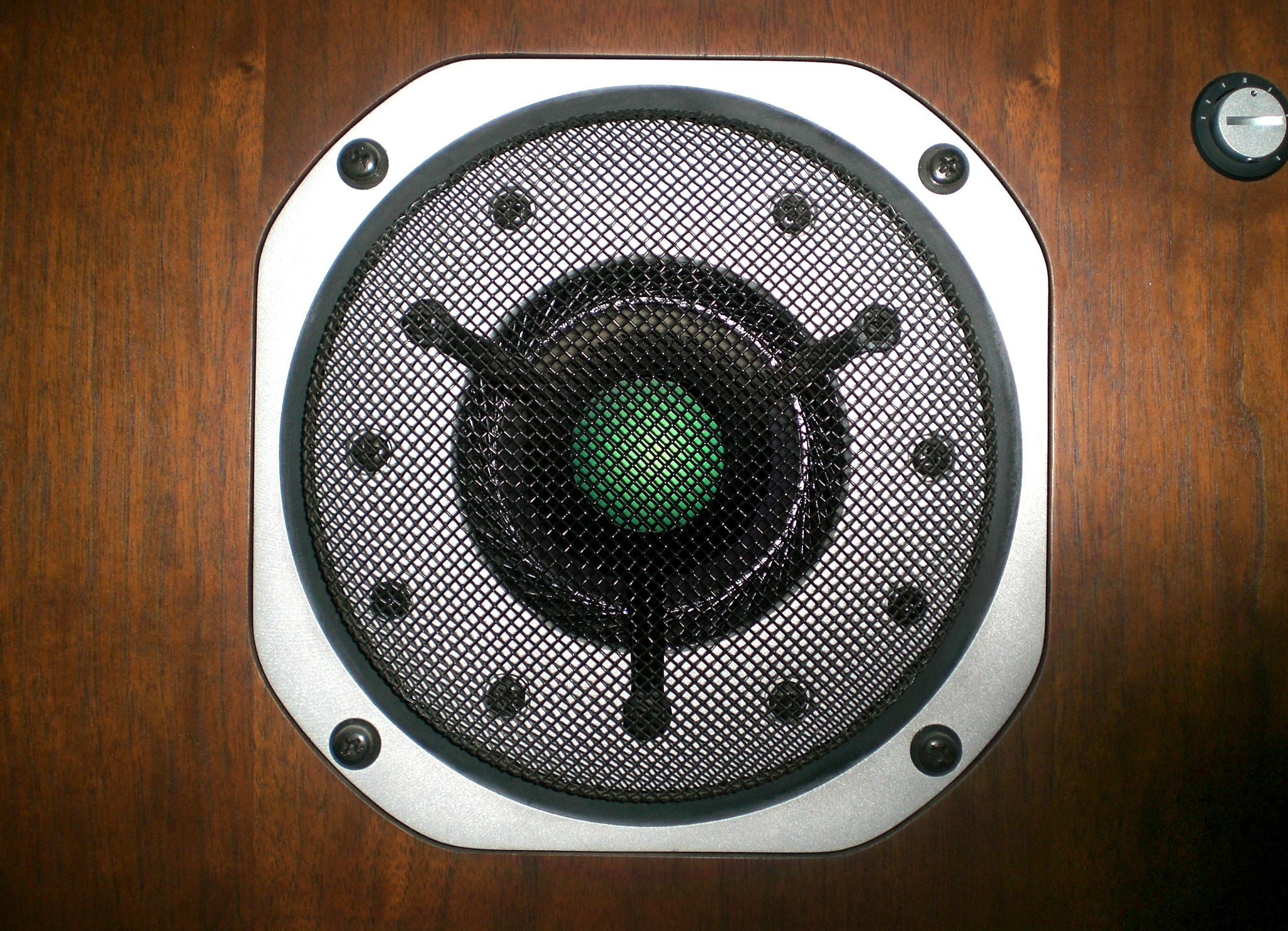
Yamaha NS-2000 Speaker, midrange.

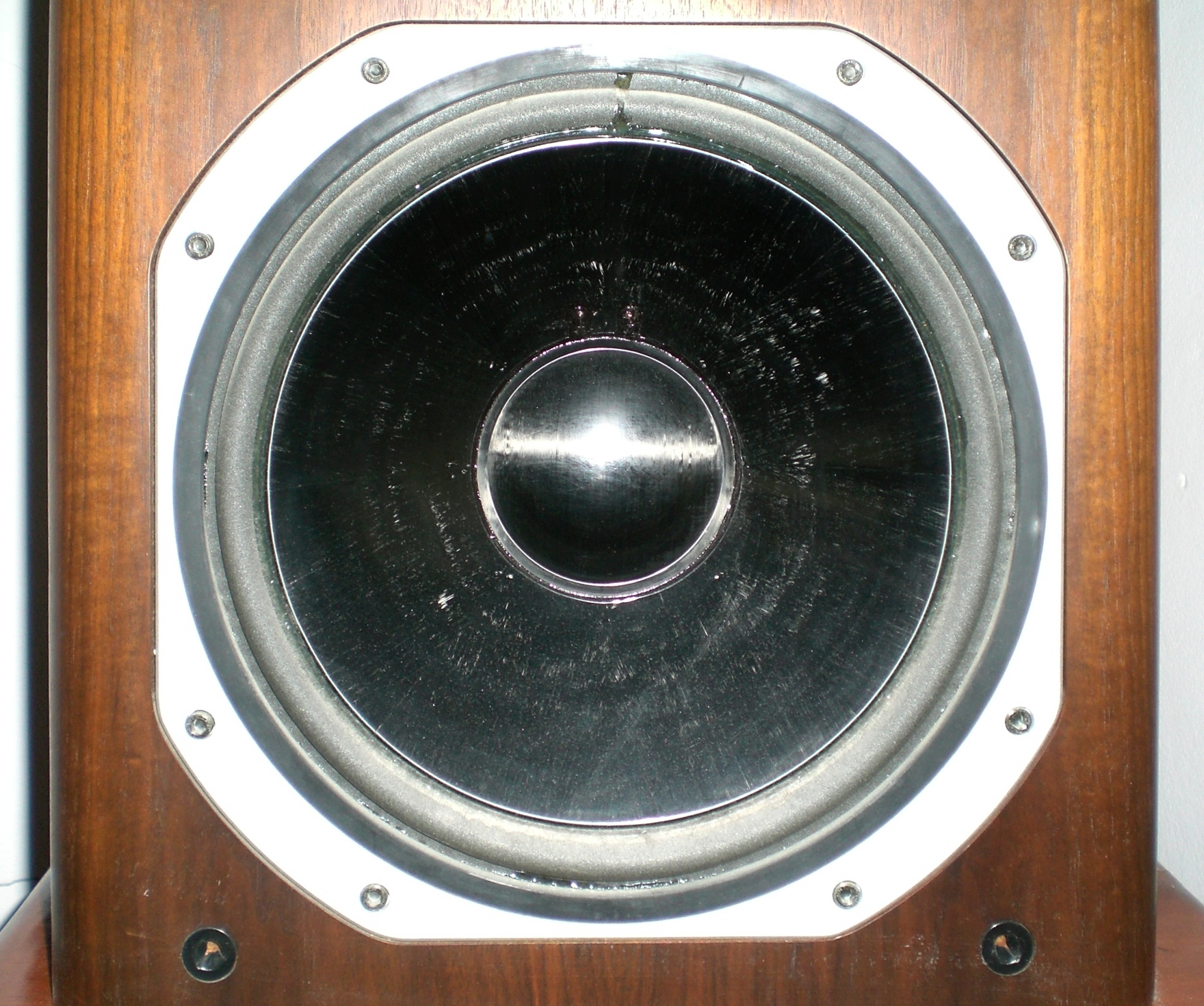
Yamaha NS-2000 Speaker, woofer front view.

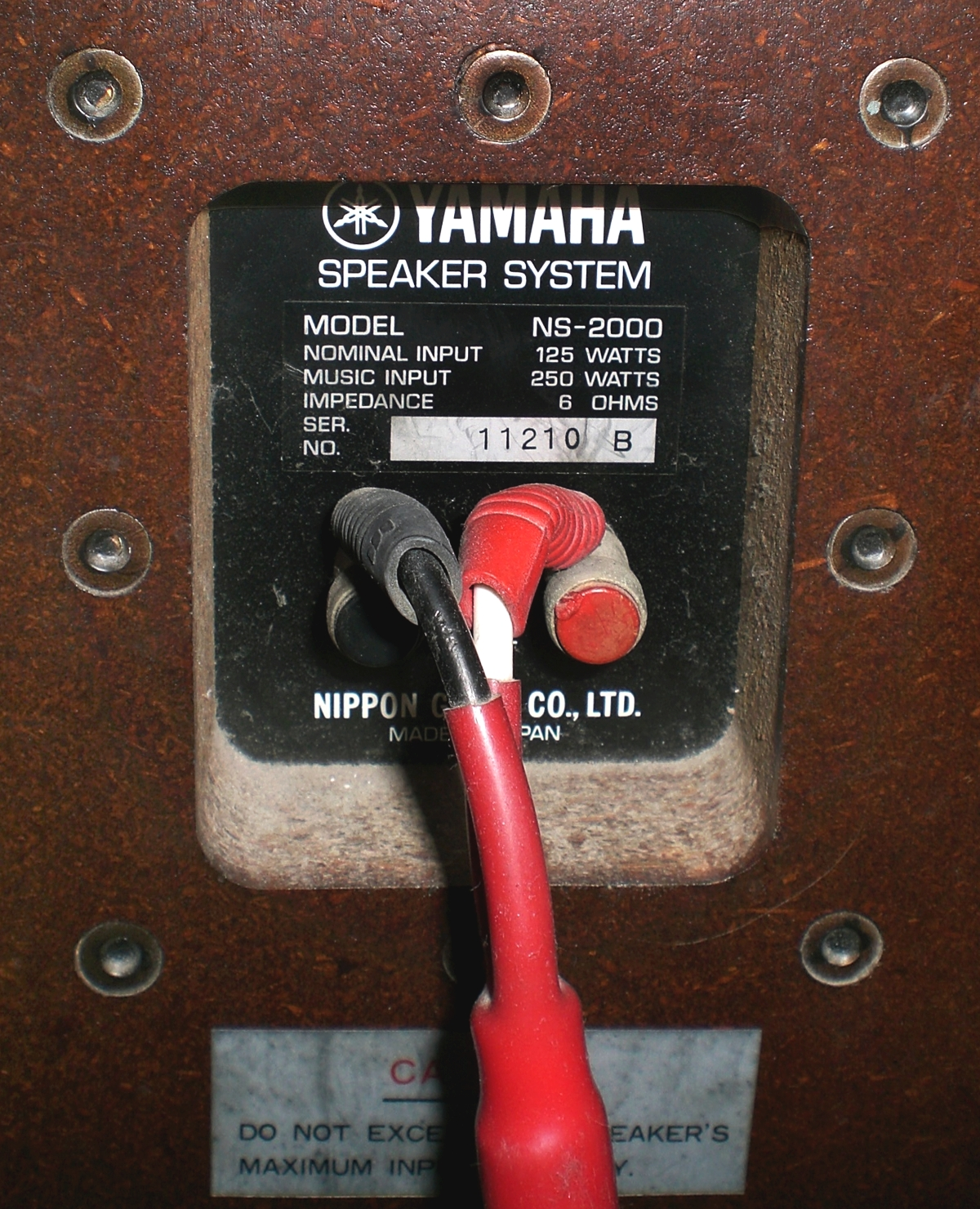
Yamaha NS-2000 Speaker, rear panel cable terminals.

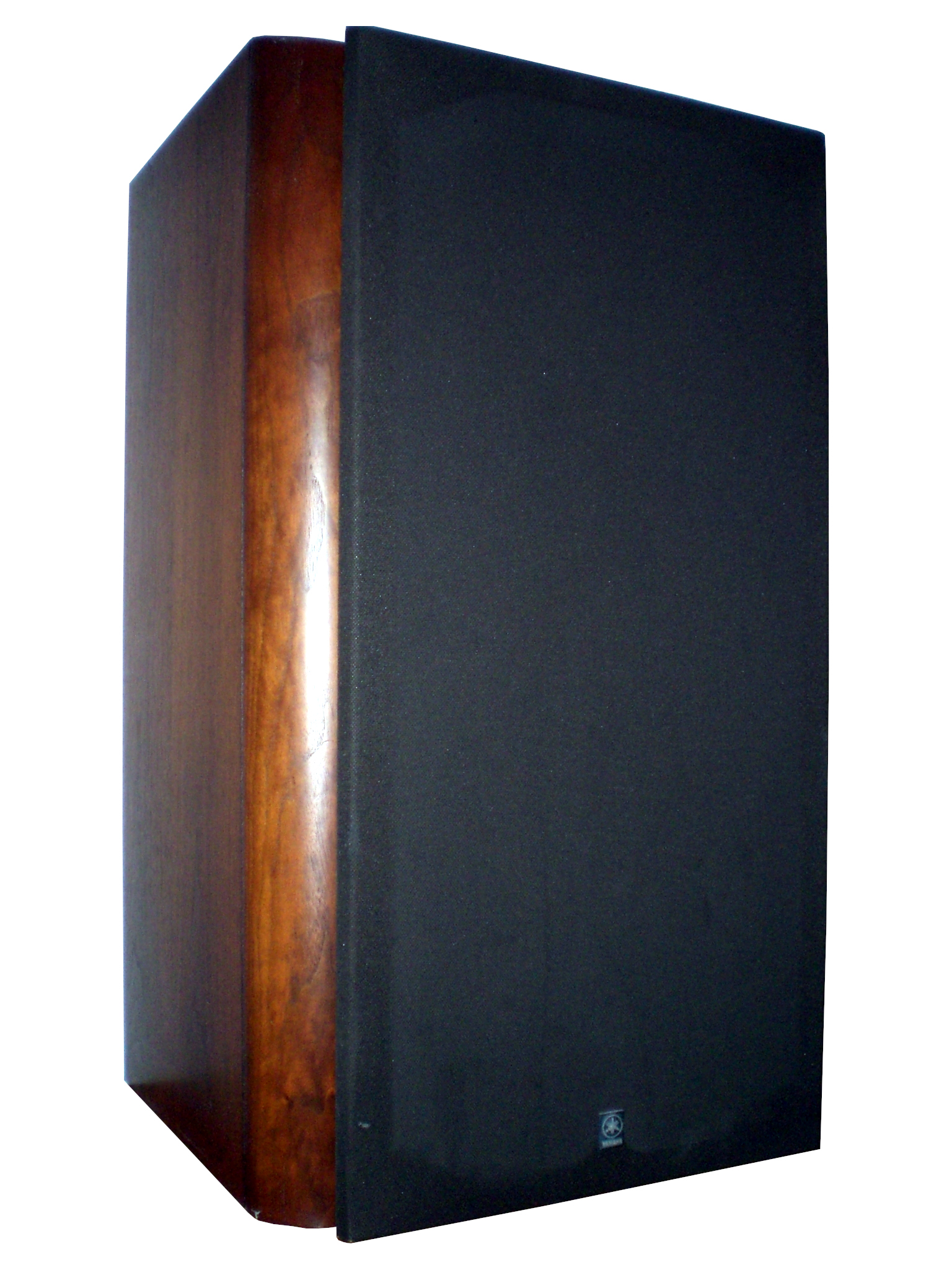
Yamaha NS-2000 Speaker, front with cover attached.

First produced in 1982, the Yamaha NS-2000 is an improved version of the older NS-1000 speaker that was first made in the early to mid-1970s. Like the NS-1000, it is a 3-way acoustic suspension speaker system with a beryllium-dome midrange and tweeter. However, the woofer of the NS-2000 was entirely new, made of pure carbon fiber instead of paper. The cabinet is also improved and is larger and heavier than that of the NS-1000.

The NS-2000 was Yamaha's top-of-the-line, flagship speaker product when it debuted. A few years later, the NSX-10000 was produced in limited numbers and is very similar to the NS-2000. The NS-2000 was later replaced by the smaller NS-1000x, which has a smaller woofer and similar but different-model beryllium-dome midrange drivers and tweeters. A limited issue walnut-veneered version of the NS-1000x, called the NS-1000xw, looks more similar to the NS-2000 than the standard black NS-1000x does. Also of note in Yamaha's line of beryllium-dome speakers is the later and extremely rare GF-1.

== Woofer ==
The woofer is made from pure, long carbon fibers that were fabricated into sheets. Eight of the sheets are bonded together to make the cone. The dust cap in the center is also a carbon fiber sheet formed into a dome. The woofer magnet is 11,350 Gauss and 220,000 Maxwell. The frame is diecast aluminum.

The original rolled edging on the woofer was made of polyurethane and designed for optimal sonic performance. However, it was often fragile and deteriorated on NS-2000 speakers. Fortunately, replacement of the edge can be done by speaker repair shops and the woofer can then continue working well.

The frequency response of the woofer is rated down to 28 Hz, making the NS-2000 a full-range speaker that may not need a separate subwoofer for low frequencies. The crossover starts at 500 Hz.

The specifications read that the woofer is 33 cm (13 in) in diameter. It is 13 inches when measured between the outer edges of the diecast aluminum frame. The inner diameter of the frame, including the cone and foam edge surround, measure about 12 inches.

== Midrange ==
The midrange dome is 8.8 cm (3.5 in) in diameter and made from beryllium metal, a very low-density (1.8 g/cm3) but strong metal, fabricated by vapor depositing the metal onto a dome mold. The result is that the midrange dome is very responsive. The dome surround is made from a cloth that is coated with two types of resins and is folded to create creases that are tangent to the dome. This design holds the dome firmly, yet allows the dome to move accurately.

The midrange dome is covered by a protective wire net. The dome is also partially covered by a ring. The ring is designed to function as a sound diffuser to improve sound dispersion and stereo imaging, but it also helps protect the dome. Some owners of the NS-1000 and NS-2000 have experimented with removing the wire net and diffuser to hear the difference, but the dome should not be touched. The NS-2000 has a cloth cover, and for some sound purists it makes a sonic difference to them to remove the cover at least (like the muffled sound of talking through a t-shirt or not).

The midrange operates the frequencies between 500 Hz and 6 kHz. The magnet is 18,400 Gauss and 150,000 Maxwell. The frame is diecast aluminum.

If input power handling is exceeded, or the dome is defective, the dome can crack or shatter into pieces. If this happens, it is possible for beryllium metal particles to be released into the air. Beryllium particles in the lungs and body are toxic and carcinogenic. Do not inhale anything from the dome.

The midrange level control knob can be turned to adjust the level between +2 dB to infinity (no sound). The tweeter has a similar level adjustment. Some owners of the NS-1000 and NS-2000 have modified their speaker to bypass these level controls which could possibly add distortion. The improved speaker, the NSX-10000, does not have these level controls.

== Tweeter ==
The tweeter is a beryllium deep dome design with a diffuser ring and protective wire net. It operates the frequencies 6 kHz to 20 kHz (and capable of much higher). The dome size is 3 cm (1-3/16") and it weighs only 0.028 grams. Similar to the midrange but smaller, it also has a tangential surround made of cloth coated with resins. The magnet is 18,800 Gauss and 34,000 Maxwell. The frame is diecast aluminum.

== Cabinet ==
The cabinet is a work of wood craftsmanship and acoustic engineering. The engineering involved using computer modal analysis to avoid excessive resonance and achieve a well-balanced modal response from the cabinet.

The engineering result is a cabinet with rounded corners that are carved from solid beech wood. Most of the rest of the cabinet is made from thick, high density particle board. The facing is American walnut. Inside the cabinet there is additional bracing in all the corners and in some other areas. The cabinet is filled with acoustic damping material. The speaker is acoustic suspension, so the whole cabinet is airtight. The total weight of an NS-2000 speaker is 47 kg (103 lb 10 oz) and the dimensions are 440 mm × 752 mm × 404 mm (17 3/8 in × 29 5/8 in × 15 7/8 in).

== Crossover Network ==
The crossover network was designed to maximize high frequency performance and minimize phase shift. All capacitors used are metallized paper (MP) types. The wiring is oxygen-free copper (OFC).

== Specifications ==
- Type: three-way acoustic suspension
- Woofer: 33 cm (13-inch) pure carbon fiber cone
- Midrange: 8.8 cm (3 1/2-inch) pure beryllium dome
- Tweeter: 3 cm (1 3/16-inch) pure beryllium dome
- Music input power: 250 W
- Nominal input power: 125 W
- Sound pressure level: 90 dB/W/m
- Nominal impedance: 6 ohms
- Frequency response: 28 Hz to 20,000 Hz
- Crossover frequencies: 500 Hz, 6 kHz (−12 dB/oct)
- Midrange level control: ± 3 dB continuous
- Tweeter level control: ± 3 dB continuous
- Dimensions (W×H×D): 440×752×404 mm (17 5/8 × 29 5/8 × 15 7/8 inches)
- Mass: 47 kg/each

== Sources ==
- Yamaha product brochure A-298, "NS-2000 Natural Sound Speaker System"
