= Acoustic transformer =

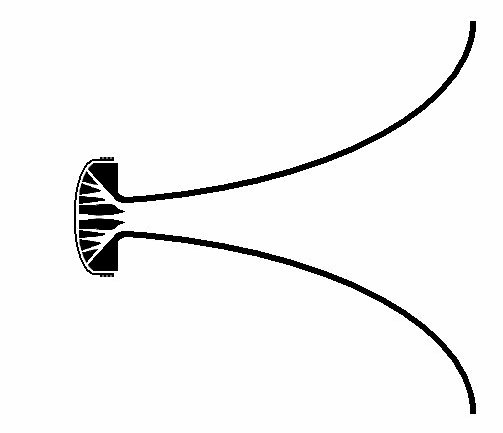
Horn loudspeaker

In a horn loudspeaker, the term acoustic transformer or acoustical transformer may refer to either of two components:

- Horn (acoustic), which attaches to the compression driver unit
- Phase plug, a component within the compression driver, the interface between the diaphragm and the horn
