= Clifford A. Henricksen =

American inventor, American musician

Clifford A Henricksen
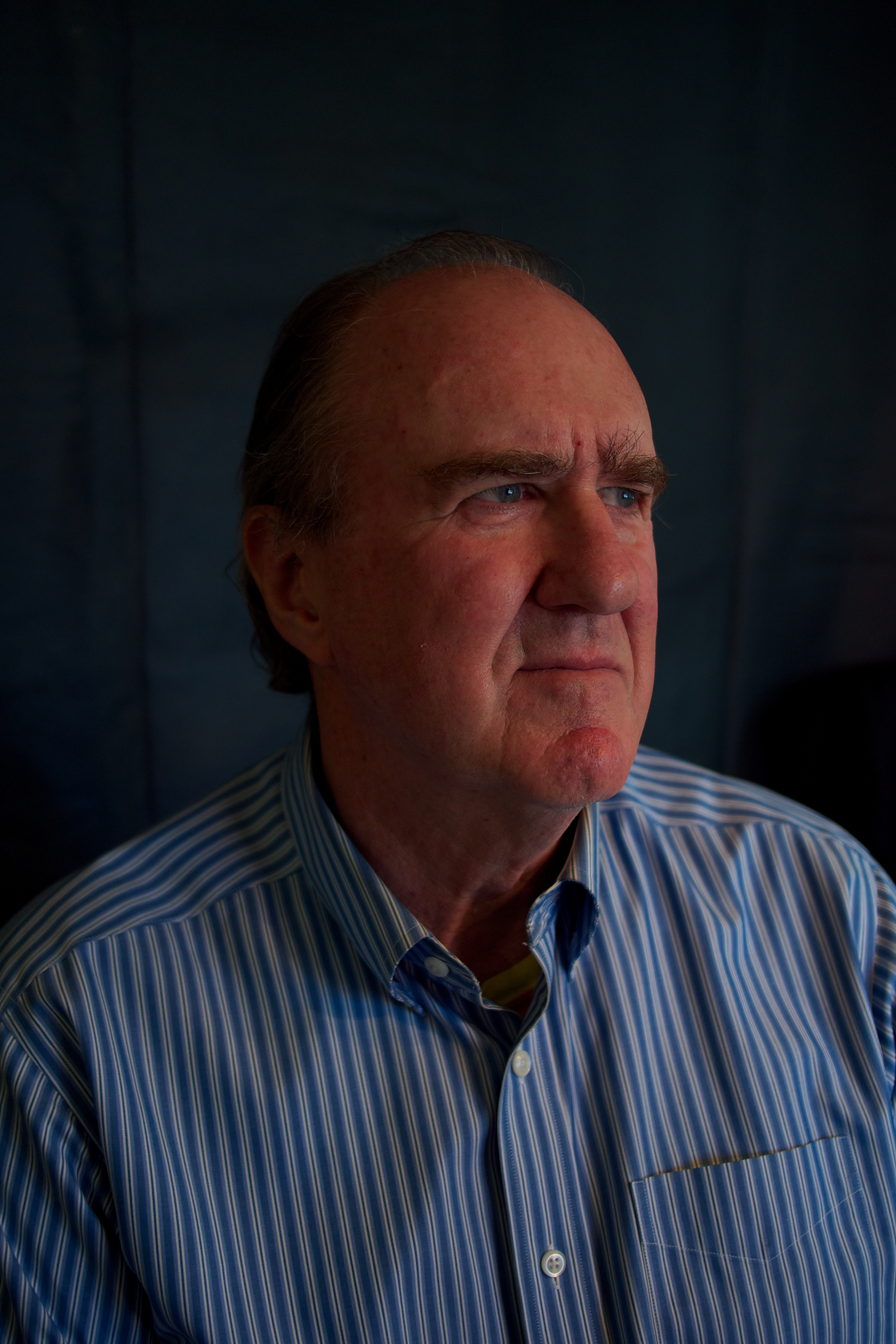
- Henricksen September 2014
- Born: July 12, 1943 (age 83); Kew Gardens, Queens
- Education: MSME
- Alma mater: Union College, Schenectady NY; Massachusetts Institute of Technology, Cambridge Massachusetts
- Occupations: Inventor, musician
- Known for: Acoustical engineering
- Spouse(s): Bonnie née Zimmermann (1967–present)
- Website: cliffmics.com

Signature
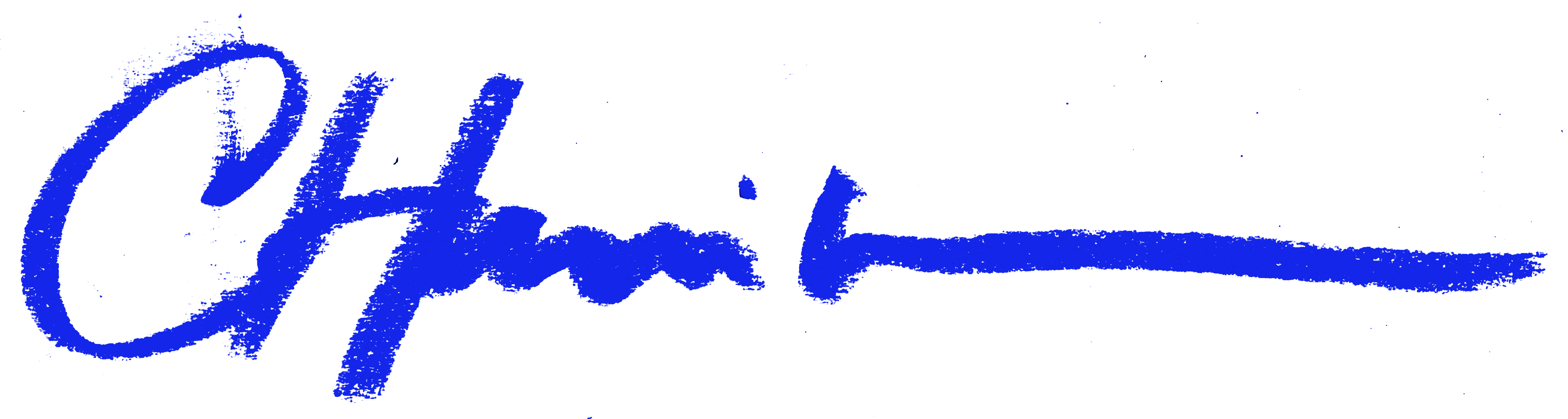

Cliff Henricksen is a musician, inventor and audio technologist. He is self-taught as a musician with a graduate degree in mechanical engineering at Massachusetts Institute of Technology (MIT). Throughout his career Cliff has found innovative ways to apply engineering basics to electro acoustics and to audio technology as it applies to music and in particular to live music performance. He has invented and engineered a wide variety of technologies and products well known in the world of professional audio. Today he balances work in audio and work as a performing musician.

Cliff Henricksen was born on July 12, 1943, in Kew Gardens on Long Island NY, the son of Norwegian immigrant Birger ("Bill") and Alice (née Totland) Henricksen, and grew up in Elmont, New York. His father's early career was as first-engineer on ocean-going ships for the Moore McCormack Company. He subsequently took a land-based day job as a mechanic and welder in order to participate more actively in home and family life. He also became an accomplished musician, playing accordion, drums and fiddle, and performing as a well-known square dance caller with a country music band called "The Ranch Boys". He also played drums at nightclub gigs and was bandleader of his own "society orchestra" that played events in venues like New York City's Waldorf Astoria Hotel. It was his father's facility with all things mechanical, as well as his love of music and his fascination with the technology behind the music, which was the single most important influence in Cliff's formative years.

Microphones, PA systems, home hi-fi systems, and tape recorders were a constant and ever-evolving part of the Henricksen household and played a significant role in shaping Cliff's technical and artistic sensibilities. By the time he got to graduate school at MIT, Cliff was playing regularly with a Boston-based cover band while still managing to make it to his 8 a.m. engineering lectures. He also met his future wife, then Bonnie Zimmermann, and together they started a family that grew to include 9 children (5 boys and 4 girls). Today Cliff and his wife Bonnie make their home in Framingham MA.

== Code of Work ==
Cliff began his career in professional audio by starting a research group at Altec Lansing in Anaheim CA in 1974. In the course of that work he met and became friends with Bill Putnam and Allen Sides, both of whom became important inspirations for achieving a balance between audio aesthetics and engineering excellence. Putnam's work on the UREI Time Align studio monitor loudspeaker, and Side's work through his Ocean Way studio business (then operating out of a garage in Santa Monica CA) were fundamental and profound influences in showing Cliff how to listen diagnostically to the audio qualities of speakers, microphones and music electronics generally. The importance of "audio aesthetics first" has been a guiding principle in all of Cliff's work since that time.

Because of this code of work and his experience as a performing musician, Cliff is one of the few audio professionals able to voice major arena sound systems by ear and to develop L1 and T1 "Tone Match" presets for Bose Corporation strictly by listening.

== Experience ==
Cliff Henricksen is a musician and composer. He is also an MIT-educated scientist and engineer who works on technology associated with professional audio and musical performance.

He has held key senior technical positions at Altec Lansing (Anaheim CA), Community Professional Systems, Electro-Voice, US Sound and Bose Corporation, where he was a key contributor to the invention, development and commercial launch of breakthrough technologies and products that have advanced and inspired the art of live music and professional/engineered sound for over 40 years. In doing so, he was able to contribute directly to enhanced market presence and increased business for his employers.

He was co-owner of US Sound, a "super contractor" with a patented and proprietary sound system components and overall system concept of his creation. It was called "Coherent Zone Technology". Engineered systems were installed, first, in the OMNI Arena (Atlanta) and later at Madison Square Garden (New York City) and used for many years for normal MSG events of all kinds. A road system was developed for The Judds and for solo shows of Wynonna Judd, mixed by house engineer John Cooper, and for Bruce Springsteen in collaboration with Audio Analysts of Colorado Springs. US Sound was sold at its prime to Bose Corporation where its product line (renamed "Panaray LT") allowed Bose to enter the large-venue engineered sound business. At Bose, Cliff went on to invent the famous "L1" line array and co-developed technologies and methodologies used in current "Room Match" and "Show Match" systems.

After a long career working for well-known professional audio companies Cliff started Cliff Innovations LLC in Framingham MA, where he developed new electroacoustic technologies and new, advanced ribbon microphone concepts, for use in recording and broadcasting. Using the new concepts for ribbon microphones, he later started the "Cliff Mics" company and introduced the RM1 ribbon microphone to the professional market at the summer Audio Engineering Society's 2014 convention in Los Angeles. This microphone used large Neodymium magnets to achieve unprecedented raw transduction sensitivity. Also, a unique phantom-powered preamplifier with proprietary voicing gave the microphone a sound presentation similar to large-diaphragm condenser microphones but having the well-known dynamic qualities unique to ribbon microphones. At this show, he was reunited with old friend Allen Sides, Grammy-winning owner of famous Ocean Way recording studios and Ocean Way Audio. Allen listened to the mic at the show. Amazed at what he heard, he offered to help Cliff promote and distribute the microphone. Cliff in turn offered to help Allen with new original loudspeaker designs. And so, they formed a "strategic alliance" defined by a personal contract, which is in place as of this writing (8/4/2021)

Today, Cliff also remains active as a recording and performing musician/composer with his band Wachadoo (www.wachadoo.com). Current recordings including unique all-ribbon recordings using prototype microphpones for kick drum, snare and stereo/overhead.

Cliff's US patents include 7,936,891 B2; 7,260,235; 7,319,767; D249,509; 3,991,286; 4,050,541; 4,187,926; 4,130,023; 4,811,403; and UK 1,514,007.

Cliff's work has been published in a range of well-known and respected technical papers, periodicals and books.

Cliff was honored as a Fellow of the Audio Engineering Society, appointed a Kentucky colonel (by the Governor of Kentucky for his contributions to the amplified musical arts) and included in the Electronic Musician's "Hall of Fame" for his basic invention of the Bose L1 line array for live performance.

== Education ==
- BSME Union College, Schenectady NY
- MSME Massachusetts Institute of Technology, Cambridge Massachusetts

== Professional Appointments ==
- Director, New Technology, Ocean Way Audio, Burbank CA 2015–present
- Principal, Cliff Mics, Framingham MA 2014–present
- Principal, Cliff Innovations LLC, Framingham MA 2009–present
- Senior Engineer, Bose Corporation, Framingham MA, 1993–2009
- Vice President of Engineering/Co-owner, US Sound, Ship Bottom NJ 1987–1993
- Senior Engineer/Manager of Transducer Group, Electro-Voice, Buchanan MI, 1983–1987
- Vice President of Engineering, Community Professional Systems, Chester PA, 1980–1983
- Manager of Acoustics Research, Altec Lansing Professional, Anaheim CA, 1974–1980

== Professional Milestones (Reverse Chronology) ==
Ocean Way Audio LCR AeroWave sound system for Granada Theater, Santa Barbara CA – Designer, mechanical engineer, acoustical engineer. 3: 90 x 90 degree fullrange high-fidelity high-efficiency directivity-control systems each cover the entire room/balcony for stereo everywhere (a first in large-venue sound) Basic acoustic design. System design, commissioning and voicing by Allen Sides and Bruce Marian.

Ocean Way Audio AeroWave large-venue sound system technology – Inventor, developer

Ocean Way Audio HR5 Studio Monitor– Smaller version of HR4, same wide stereo zone. Basic acoustic design. LF and overall system design and voicing by Allen Sides and Bruce Marian.

Ocean Way Audio HR3.5 Studio Monitor – Triamped variant of HR4 with dual 12” woofers for extended low end. Basic acoustic design. LF and overall system design and voicing by Allen Sides and Bruce Marian.

Ocean Way Audio HR4 Studio Monitor – 100x 40 degree system with extremely wide stereo listening zone (eliminates “sweet spot” present in all direct-radiator monitors). Basic acoustic design. System design and voicing by Allen Sides and Bruce Marian.

Ocean Way Audio RM1b Studio Microphone – Updated version of the RM1. “Ribbon Safe” and other improvements for shipping protection, improved grille, some aesthetic changes.

Ocean Way Audio, Director, New Technology: heading up the new products development team, building on the platform established with the No Limits HR series.

Cliff Mics, a DBA division of Cliff Innovations LLC: Developed the RM1 advanced-technology ribbon microphone.

Bose Corporation “Room Match” engineered sound system: Many in-development/patents-pending (confidential). Co-inventor of the basic electroacoustic technology and means of creating flexible, scalable sound systems using parametric n/c machining and related business-system techniques and unique assembly methods.

Bose Corporation L1® family: Builder/first-live-music-user of first L1 prototypes and inventor of core L1 technologies and methodology , collaborating with Ken Jacob of Bose. Creator of and naming of "Tone Match" instrument/delivery system integration used on all L1 and T1 products, creator of most "ToneMatch" voicing filters by ear, often in collaboration with major instrument makers and microphone manufacturers. Creator of a large volume of support copy, used in advertising of all kinds. Responsible for engineering development and personal use of the first prototype systems. (This overall concept is changing the entire culture of live amplified music.) Held keyboard/vocal chair for the duration of the "Linemen" L1-demo band, this band actually being built around the L1 with local "A-list" players. Many concerts stunned audiences with superb musicianship, arrangements and sound quality in the US, Canada and Europe. Countless concerts were performed in Bose Corporation's own auditorium and live-music theater, where Cliff also performed solo during these shows, playing piano and singing, often performing his own compositions.

Bose Corporation MA12 and MB4: Early spin-offs of the L1 program, before it became such. These components are still mainstays of the engineered sound product line.

Bose Corporation Panaray LT family: Design of core arraying loudspeaker family for high-end large-venue sound including invention and engineering of “V4” manifolded midrange driver.

Bose Corporation sound system for the Holy Mosque, Mecca: Designed a horn-waveguide system for this acoustically-challenging, aesthetically-demanding all-marble facility.

Bose Corporation arena sound systems (GM Place/Vancouver BC, Staples Arena/Los Angeles CA, Air Canada Centre/Toronto ON): Internal design consultant and final in-situ system voicing/commissioning by ear.

Universal Islands of Adventure, Orlando FL (for Bose) : Inspired dock-piling-themed line array systems and voiced all sound zones by ear, with Bruce Myers, on startup of this facility.

Fender Musical Instruments Passport PD150 and PD250 systems: Basic electroacoustic concept invention and development of first working prototypes (Part of a Bose/Fender collaboration)

Audio Analysts/Bruce Springsteen Systems – Collaboration with co-owner Albert Leccesse on a high acoustic output, clear monitor speaker for the artist, based on the US Sound CZ44 (now Bose LT4402). Also, design and use of a wide-angle end cluster for shows at the unusually-long Wembley Arena in the UK.

US Sound Coherent Zone Loudspeaker family: Invention, component and system design, production engineering, technical support.

US Sound Arena Sound Systems (The OMNI/Atlanta GA, Madison Square Garden/NYC NY): System concept, design (first “exploded-cluster” arena system in America), installation engineering and supervision, final system voicing by ear. Systems sold directly to the arenas.

US Sound Touring Sound System for The Judds/Wynonna Judd : First “Coherent Zone” sound system design including first high-directivity mid/high, 18” bass system and very low-profile stage monitor for improved visual qualities.

Electro Voice MT™ Manifold Technology sound reinforcement system: Basic research and invention leading to this breakthrough, multiple manifolded-driver product design. This work and product concept inspired a number of new ideas (throughout the industry) in systems concepts and designs.

Electro Voice HP horns, DL woofer family, DH1 compression driver: Engineering management of the team to produce these component series, contributed many innovations.

Community M4™ midrange driver: Developed basic equations of operation including the phase plug and motor design, co-developed the product, authored several technical and technical/marketing papers and articles.

Altec Lansing Manta Ray Horn family: Invention, patenting, co-development and design of large- and small-format horns for various coverage patterns and uses, including consumer hifi.

Altec Lansing Tangerine Phase plug family : Invention, patenting, design, prototype building and production engineering of 3 phaseplugs for 2.83”, 1.75” and 1.75” piezo-driven diaphragms (“LZT” driver for consumer systems). Developed original equations of operation and co-authored patent and technical articles. Also gave it the name, earning a distinct market awareness.

Altec Lansing Auto-Q automatic directivity measurement technology : Inventor, patented.

Altec Lansing Voice of the Highway system for automotive sound systems: Gave it the name, based on the iconic “Voice of the Theater”.

== Patents ==
Clifford A. Henricksen

1. US Patent 11,058,394 "Stethoscope" (novel passive medical stethoscope including self-sterelizing variant, with MD's Peter and Carla Faulkner/Innovative Medecine Partners, Mobile Alabama)
2. US Patents D830342 D837183 D871370 (Ocean Way Audio studio monitor loudspeaker systems)
3. US Patent 7,936,891 B2 (Bose L1 Model2 “articulated array”)
4. US Patent 7,260,235 (Line electroacoustical transducing – Bose L1 line array for live music)
5. US Patent 7,319,767 (Line array electroacoustical transducing – Overall mechanical arrangement of Bose L1 model 1)
6. US Patent D249,509 (Acoustical transformer for coupling sound waves from the diaphragm to the throat of a horn-type loudspeaker )
7. US Patent 3,991,286 (Heat dissipating device for loudspeaker voice coil )
8. US Patent 4,050,541 (Acoustical transformer for horn-type loudspeaker Altec "Tangerine " phase plug)
9. US Patent 4,187,926 (Loudspeaker horn Altec "Manta-Ray" diffraction-slot constant-directivity horn)
10. US Patent 4,130,023 (Method and apparatus for testing and evaluating loudspeaker performance Auto-Q directivity measurement method) discussed in above paper
11. US Patent 4,811,403 (Ultralight loudspeaker enclosures US Sound/Bose Corporation lightweight loudspeaker systems construction method) 3/7/89
12. Other patents pending

== Technical Publications ==
Clifford A. Henricksen

1. "Loudspeakers Enclosures and Headphones", Handbook for Sound Engineers-The New Audio Cyclopedia, Howard W. Sams Co. 1987
2. "Sound Reinforcement in the Year 2000"
  - a) Invited paper, presented at the 6th International Audio Engineering Society (AES) Conference on Sound Reinforcement, May 5–8, Nashville TN, Proceedings published March 1989
  - b) Presented at the Altec Lansing All-Technical Engineered Sound Conference October 16–17, 1988, Montreal Quebec Canada (Invited paper)
3. "Heat Transfer Mechanisms in Loudspeakers; Analysis Measurement and Design" Journal of the Audio Engineering Society, vol 35, no.10, October 1987
4. "Directivity Response of Single Direct-Radiator Loudspeakers in Enclosures" Altec Technical Letter 227
5. "Phase Plug Modelling and Analysis: Circumferential Versus Radial Types" Presented at the 59th Convention of the AES, Hamburg, Germany, March 1978, AES preprint 1328(F5)
6. "The Manta-Ray Horns" (co-authored with Mark Ureda), Journal of the Audio Engineering Society, vol 26 no. 9, September 1978
7. "Auto Q: A New Directivity Measurement System" Presented at 60th AES Convention, May 1978, Los Angeles, AES preprint 1360(F6)
8. "Vented Box Design Method for Altec Low-Frequency Loudspeakers" Altec Technical Letter 245
9. "Ultimate Performance of Wide-Range High Frequency Compression Drivers" Journal of the Audio Engineering Society vol 24, no. 8, October 1976
10. "Engineering Justifications for Selected Portions of the AES Recommended Practice for Specification of Loudspeaker Components" Presented as the 72nd Convention, October 1982, Anaheim CA, AES reprint 32(G10)
11. "Sound System Design Using Mechanical Specifications of Drivers" Syn-Aud-Con Tech Topics vol 11 no.2
12. "A High-Efficiency One-Decade Midrange Loudspeaker" (co-author with Bruce Howze) Paper on the Community M4 driver-Presented at the 70th convention, New York, October 1981, AES preprint 1848(D8)

== Periodical Publications ==
1. "State-of-the-Art Specs, Finally!" Sound and Video Contractor, September 1984
2. "Low-Frequency Driver Performance" Sound and Video Contractor, June 1986
3. "Unearthing the Mysteries of the Leslie Cabinet" Recording Engineer/Producer, April 1981
4. "Designing a Conical Bass-Horn Control Room" Recording Engineer/Producer, March 1987
5. Guest Editorial-"No Sweat, No Music – A Player Laments the Spread of Computer Dependency" Keyboard Magazine, August 1985
6. "Jammin' in the Rockies – Rediscovery of the Ancient Roller Playground" Skateboard Magazine, October 1976
7. Book Review of "Loudspeakers" edited by John Borwick, Sound and Communications Magazine, March 1989.

== Books ==
- Henricksen, Clifford A. (July 2010). The Gasoline Chronicles (1st ed.). Boston, MA.: Lulu (company). ISBN 9780557541027.
- Henricksen, Clifford A. (September 2011). The Gasoline Chronicles (2nd ed.). Boston, MA.: Lulu (company). ISBN 9781257706556.
