= Up the River (disambiguation) =

Up the River is a 1930 film.

Up the River may also refer to:

- Upriver, the direction towards the source of a river
- Up the River (1938 film)
- "Up the River" (Dream On), a 1990 television episode
- "Up the River" (Future song), from High Off Life, 2020
- "Up the river", a phrase to describe someone in prison or heading to prison, see Sing Sing

== See also ==
- Up and down the river, a variation of the card game Oh hell
- Upstream (disambiguation)
