= Dust cap =

Protective dome in loudspeakers

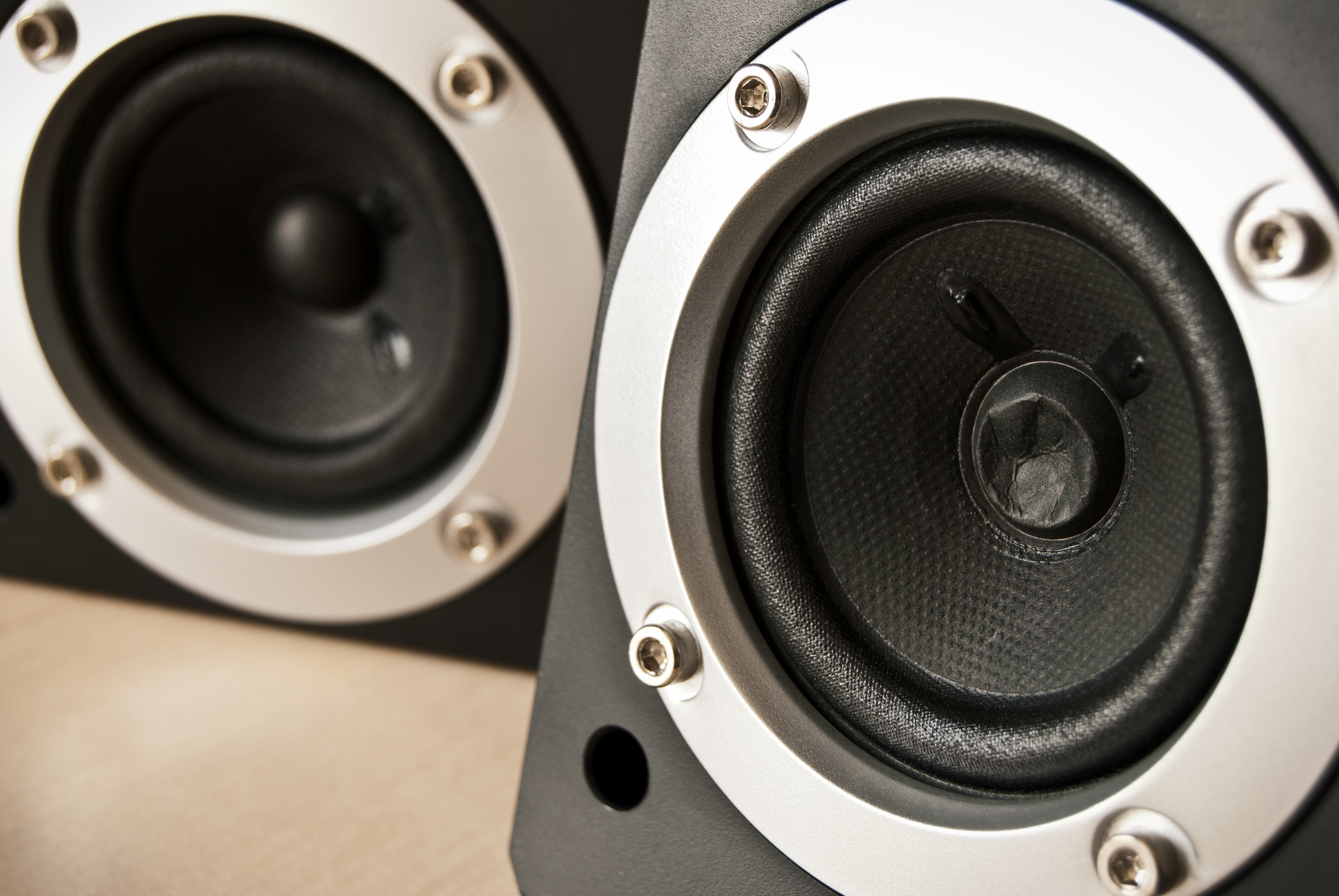
A dust cap which has been damaged (pushed in).

The dust cap (also known as dust dome, or dome) is a gently curved dome mounted either in concave or convex orientation over the central hole of most loudspeaker diaphragms. It protects the inner mechanics (such as the pole pieces and the voice coil) from small particles (which can cause rubs) and other contamination. Dust caps can also contribute structural integrity to the voice coil assembly or the cone.

In some loudspeaker designs, dust caps can also be part of the acoustic design of the driver by radiating high frequency energy or suppressing it. Typically the dust cap is made of the same material as the cone. In some tweeter designs, the dome is in fact the only sound radiating surface and so it performs both roles. Speakers with dust caps are contrasted with bullet speakers which have a pointed phase plug shaped like the front of a bullet in the center of the speaker.
