= Software ecosystem =

Software Ecosystem is a book written by David G. Messerschmitt and Clemens Szyperski that explains the essence and effects of a "software ecosystem", defined as a set of businesses functioning as a unit and interacting with a shared market for software and services, together with relationships among them. These relationships are frequently underpinned by a common technological platform and operate through the exchange of information, resources, and artifacts.

== The term in software analysis ==
In the context of software analysis, the term software ecosystem is defined by Lungu as “a collection of software projects, which are developed and co-evolve in the same environment”. The environment can be organizational (a company), social (an open-source community), or technical (the Ruby ecosystem). The ecosystem metaphor is used in order to denote an analysis which takes into account multiple software systems. The most frequent of such analyses is static analysis of the source code of the component systems of the ecosystem.

Software analysis is the process of systematically examining and evaluating software applications to assess their design, functionality, performance, and adherence to requirements. This involves reviewing code, testing the software for bugs or vulnerabilities, ensuring compliance with design specifications, and optimizing for efficiency. Software analysis helps identify potential issues early in the development cycle, improves overall quality, and ensures that the software meets the intended goals. It includes techniques like static code analysis, dynamic analysis, and performance profiling to provide insights for better software maintenance and improvement.

== Examples ==
- Microsoft Windows operating systems and applications using Windows API.
- Apple iOS and iOS apps.
- Googlebook OS and Google Play
