= Phase plug =

Loudspeaker component

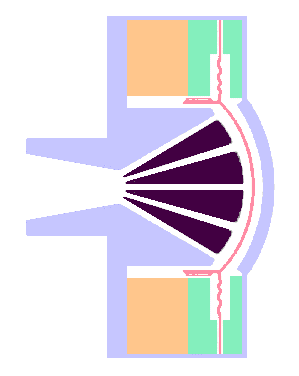
Diagram of a compression driver. The phase plug is shown in dark purple.

In a loudspeaker, a phase plug, phasing plug or acoustical transformer is a mechanical interface between a speaker driver and the audience. The phase plug extends high frequency response because it guides waves outward toward the listener rather than allowing them to interact destructively near the driver.

Phase plugs are commonly found in high-powered horn loudspeakers used in professional audio, in the mid- and high-frequency bandpasses, positioned between the compression driver diaphragm and the acoustic horn. They may also be present in front of woofer cones in some loudspeaker designs. In each case they serve to equalize sound wave path lengths from the driver to the listener, to prevent cancellations and frequency response problems. The phase plug can be considered a further narrowing of the horn throat, becoming an extension of the horn to the surface of the diaphragm.

== History ==
An electromechanical driver of the sort later used in loudspeakers was invented by German industrialist Werner von Siemens in 1877 but no practical amplification existed to create the loudspeaker until 1921. Various loudspeaker designs were produced in the 1920s, including General Electric engineers Chester W. Rice and Edward W. Kellogg mating an acoustic horn to the speaker driver in 1925. In 1926, Bell System engineers Albert L. Thuras and Edward C. Wente modified the horn loudspeaker by inserting the first phase plug between the driver and the horn. This phase plug directed sound waves into the horn throat from the center of the diaphragm and from a ring around the perimeter of the diaphragm, by way of center hole and annular slot, for the purpose of improving "the transmission characteristics" of the loudspeaker "at the upper portion of the sound frequency range." Based on their joint research, the two engineers were awarded consecutive U.S. patents: Thuras filed a patent for a novel electrodynamic diaphragm design, and Wente filed a patent for the first phase plug. The principles laid out by Thuras and Wente have influenced every subsequent phase plug design.

== Compression drivers ==
Two types of dome-type phase plug: one with radial slits and one with concentric ring slits, also called annular or circumferential

In horn loudspeakers, the phase plug serves to carry sound waves out from all areas of the compression driver diaphragm through the compression chamber to the horn throat such that each pulse of sound reaches the throat as one coherent wave front. With a successful implementation, high-frequency performance is extended higher.

The phase plug is a complex and expensive element of the compression driver. Its manufacture requires fine tolerances. Phase plugs are machined in metals such as aluminum, or cast in hard plastic or Bakelite. Meyer Sound Laboratories chose a lightweight plastic because of its resistance to temperature and humidity.

Many variations exist in phase plug design, but two types have evolved to match two major diaphragm types: dome and ring.

Dome-based diaphragms are similar to the 1920s Thuras/Wente patents, and are still in common use today. Phase plugs that interface with dome-type diaphragms include a wide variety: designs with radial slots, designs with concentric annular ring slots, and hybrid designs with a combination of annular and radial slots. Altec engineer Clifford A. Henricksen reported on the differences between radial and "circumferential" types of phase plugs at Audio Engineering Society conventions in 1976 and 1978. The radial design is easier to produce, but it does not differentiate between sound waves from the perimeter of the diaphragm and sound waves from the center. At high frequencies, the diaphragm does not act as a perfect piston; instead, it displays rippling, modal properties related to its stiffness and density. Because of the speed of wave propagation through the diaphragm material, the center of the diaphragm moves slightly later than the perimeter. Radial slots in the phase plug do not correct for this small time difference, which affects the highest frequencies. Concentric circular slots may be able to correct for the diaphragm's rippling behavior but the positioning of the slots is critical. Circular slots may allow resonances to build up between the diaphragm and the phase plug—resonances which cause wave cancellations and a corresponding reduction in frequency response at the resonance frequency.

The less common ring diaphragm is a later development intended to minimize the problems related to wave propagation through the diaphragm material. This design requires a radically different shape of phase plug, but radial slots and concentric rings may still play a part.

The combined area of the phase plug slots is typically about one-eighth to one-tenth of the area of the diaphragm. This gives a pressure-to-volume velocity change ratio in the range of 8:1 to 10:1, which serves to match the impedance of the diaphragm to the horn throat. A larger slot area admits more sound wave energy but also reflects more energy backward onto the diaphragm. A smaller slot area traps more wave energy between the phase plug and the diaphragm. In researching the diaphragm/phase plug interface, David Gunness found that only half the wave energy, at best, travels directly from the diaphragm through the phase plug slots and out to the listener. The other half (or more) causes cancellations within the space between the diaphragm and the phase plug, or causes temporal anomalies (time smear) upon leaving the phase plug later than the direct sound. To minimize the problem, Gunness modeled the behavior mathematically and used digital signal processing to apply a polarity-reversed version of the undesired wave behavior to the original audio signal.

== Woofers ==
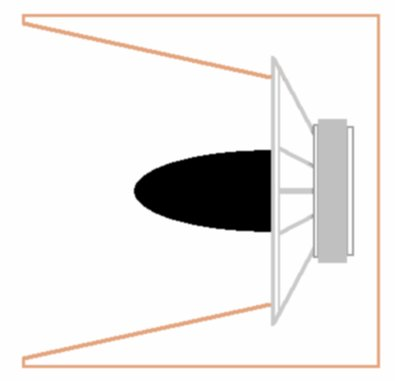
Horn-loaded woofer showing a phase plug in black

Phase plugs may be placed in front of woofer cones, especially in horn-loaded loudspeaker designs. In the same fashion as compression driver phase plugs, the intent is to minimize higher-frequency wave interference near the driver. In this case, "high frequency" is relative to the intended bandpass; for example, a 12-inch (300 mm) cone woofer might be expected to reproduce 550 Hz energy near the top of its intended range, however, the wavelength of 550 Hz is approximately twice the diameter of the woofer, so wave energy at that frequency traveling laterally from one side to the other will be out of phase and will cancel. With a phase plug in the center, such lateral wave energy bounces off of the obstruction and is reflected outward toward the listener. Phase plugs for woofer cones are typically solid plugs positioned over the woofer's central dust cap, or in the center of the woofer, replacing the dust cap.
