= Downstream (software development) =

Concept in computer science

In software development, downstream refers to a direction away from the original authors or maintainers of software that is distributed as source code, and is a qualification of a patch. For example, a patch sent downstream is offered to the developers or maintainers of a forked software project. If accepted, the developers or maintainers will include the patch in their software fork, either immediately or in a future release. Sometimes, "downstream" is used in contexts in which the developer does not have control, perhaps due to its inclusion as part other software or as part of a system.

For contrast, upstream refers to code sent toward the original development team.

== See also ==
- Upstream (software development)
- Backporting
- Waterfall software development
- Fork (software development)
