= Strategic alliance =

Agreement between two or more parties

A strategic alliance is an agreement between two or more parties to pursue a set of agreed upon objectives needed while remaining independent organizations.

The alliance is a cooperation or collaboration which aims for a synergy where each partner hopes that the benefits from the alliance will be greater than those from individual efforts. The alliance often involves technology transfer (access to knowledge and expertise), economic specialization, shared expenses and shared risk.

A strategic alliance will usually fall short of a legal partnership entity, agency, or corporate affiliate relationship. Typically, two companies form a strategic alliance when each possesses one or more business assets or have expertise that will help the other by enhancing their businesses.

Strategic alliances can develop in outsourcing relationships where the parties desire to achieve long-term win-win benefits and innovation based on mutually desired outcomes. This form of cooperation lies between mergers and acquisitions and organic growth. Strategic alliances occur when two or more organizations join to pursue mutual benefits.

Partners may provide the strategic alliance with resources such as products, distribution channels, manufacturing capability, project funding, capital equipment, knowledge, expertise, or intellectual property.

== Definitions and discussion ==
There are several ways of defining a strategic alliance. Some of the definitions emphasize the fact that the partners do not create a new legal entity, i.e. a new company. This excludes legal formations like joint ventures from the field of Strategic Alliances. Others see joint ventures as possible manifestations of Strategic Alliances. Some definitions are given here:

=== Definitions including joint ventures ===
- A strategic alliance is an agreement between two or more players to share resources or knowledge, to be beneficial to all parties involved. It is a way to supplement internal assets, capabilities and activities, with access to needed resources or processes from outside players such as suppliers, customers, competitors, companies in different industries, brand owners, universities, institutes or divisions of government.
- A strategic alliance is an organizational and legal construct wherein “partners” are willing-in fact, motivated-to act in concert and share core competencies. This is especially relevant in strategic outsourcing relationships. To a greater or lesser degree, some alliances result in the virtual integration of the parties through partial equity ownership, through contracts that define rights, roles and responsibilities over a span of time or through the purchase of non-controlling equity interests. Eventually, many result in integration through acquisition.

=== Definitions excluding joint ventures ===
- An arrangement between two companies that have decided to share resources to undertake a specific, mutually beneficial project. A strategic alliance is less involved and less permanent than a joint venture, in which two companies typically pool resources to create a separate business entity. In a strategic alliance, each company maintains its autonomy while gaining a new opportunity. A strategic alliance could help a company develop a more effective process, expand into a new market or develop an advantage over a competitor, among other possibilities.
- Agreement for cooperation among two or more independent firms to work together toward common objectives. Unlike in a joint venture, firms in a strategic alliance do not form a new entity to further their aims but collaborate while remaining apart and distinct.
- Included in this agreement among two or more parties working together for the achievement of common objectives, is the ability to create new value for the parties involved. It cannot be overstated that the achievement of value may come in many forms including new entries to market, speed to market, innovation or new product or process, etc.

== Terminology ==
Various terms have been used to describe forms of strategic partnering. These include ‘international coalitions’ (Porter and Fuller, 1986), ‘strategic networks’ (Jarillo, 1988) and, most commonly, ‘strategic alliances’. Definitions are equally varied. An alliance may be seen as the ‘joining of forces and resources, for a specified or indefinite period, to achieve a common objective’.

There are seven general areas in which profit can be made from building alliances. ХдрЦ

== Typology ==
Some types of strategic alliances include:

- Horizontal strategic alliances, which are formed by firms that are active in the same business area. That means that the partners in the alliance used to be competitors and work together In order to improve their position in the market and improve market power compared to other competitors. Research &Development collaborations of enterprises in high-tech markets are typical Horizontal Alliances. Raue & Wieland (2015) describe the example of horizontal alliances between logistics service providers. They argue that such companies can benefit twofold from such an alliance. On the one hand, they can "access tangible resources which are directly exploitable". This includes extending common transportation networks, their warehouse infrastructure and the ability to provide more complex service packages by combining resources. On the other hand, they can "access intangible resources, which are not directly exploitable". This includes know-how and information and, in turn, innovativeness.
- Vertical strategic alliances, which describe the collaboration between a company and its upstream and downstream partners in the Supply Chain, that means a partnership between a company its suppliers and distributors. Vertical Alliances aim at intensifying and improving these relationships and to enlarge the company's network to be able to offer lower prices. Especially suppliers get involved in product design and distribution decisions. An example would be the close relation between car manufacturers and their suppliers.
- Intersectional alliances are partnerships where the involved firms are neither connected by a vertical chain, nor work in the same business area, which means that they normally would not get in touch with each other and have totally different markets and know-how.
- Joint ventures, in which two or more companies decide to form a new company. This new company is then a separate legal entity. The forming companies invest equity and resources in general, like know-how. These new firms can be formed for a finite time, like for a certain project or for a lasting long-term business relationship, while control, revenues and risks are shared according to their capital contribution.
- Equity alliances, which are formed when one company acquires equity stake of another company and vice versa. These shareholdings make the company stakeholders and shareholders of each other. The acquired share of a company is a minor equity share, so that decision power remains at the respective companies. This is also called cross-shareholding and leads to complex network structures, especially when several companies are involved. Companies which are connected this way share profits and common goals, which leads to the fact that the will to compete between these firms is reduced. In addition this makes take-overs by other companies more difficult.
- Non-equity strategic alliances, which cover a wide field of possible cooperation between companies. This can range from close relations between customer and supplier, to outsourcing of certain corporate tasks or licensing, to vast networks in R&D. This cooperation can either be an informal alliance which is not contractually designated, which appears mostly among smaller enterprises, or the alliance can be set by a contract.

Michael Porter and Mark Fuller, founding members of the Monitor Group (now Monitor Deloitte), draw a distinction among types of strategic alliances according to their purposes:

- Technology development alliances, which are alliances with the purpose of improvement in technology and know-how, for example consolidated Research & Development departments, agreements about simultaneous engineering, technology commercialization agreements as well as licensing or joint development agreements.
- Operations and logistics alliances, where partners either share the costs of implementing new manufacturing or production facilities, or utilize already existing infrastructure in foreign countries owned by a local company.
- Marketing, sales and service strategic alliances, in which companies take advantage of the existing marketing and distribution infrastructure of another enterprise in a foreign market to distribute its own products to provide easier access to these markets.
- Multiple activity alliance, which connect several of the described types of alliances. Marketing alliances most often operate as single country alliances, international enterprises use several alliances in each country and technology and development alliances are usually multi-country alliances. These different types and characters can be combined in a multiple activity alliance.

Further kinds of strategic alliances include:

- Cartels: Big companies can cooperate unofficially, to control production and/or prices within a certain market segment or business area and constrain their competition
- Franchising: a franchiser gives the right to use a brand-name and corporate concept to a franchisee who has to pay a fixed amount of money. The franchiser keeps the control over pricing, marketing and corporate decisions in general.
- Licensing: A company pays for the right to use another company's technology or production processes.
- Industry standard groups: These are groups of normally large enterprises, that try to enforce technical standards according to their own production processes.
- Outsourcing: Production steps that do not belong to the core competencies of a firm are likely to be outsourced, which means that another company is paid to accomplish these tasks.
- Affiliate marketing: a web-based distribution method where one partner provides the possibility of selling products via its sales channels in exchange of a beforehand defined provision.

== Historical development of strategic alliances ==
Some analysts may say that strategic alliances are a recent phenomena in our time, in fact collaborations between enterprises are as old as the existence of such enterprises. Examples would be early credit institutions or trade associations like the early Dutch guilds. There have always been strategic alliances, but in the last couple of decades the focus and reasons for strategic alliances has evolved very very quickly:

In the 1970s, the focus of strategic alliances was the performance of the product. The partners wanted to attain raw material at the best quality at the lowest price possible, the best technology and improved market penetration, while the focus was always on the product.

In the 1980s, strategic alliances aimed at building economies of scale and scope. The involved enterprises tried to consolidate their positions in their respective sectors. During this time the number of strategic alliances increased dramatically. Some of these partnerships lead to great product successes like photocopiers by Canon sold under the brand of Kodak, or the partnership of Toshiba and Motorola whose joining of resources and technology lead to great success with microprocessors.

In the 1990s, geographical borders between markets collapsed and new markets were enterable. Higher requirements for the companies lead to the need for constant innovation for competitive advantage. The focus of strategic alliances relocated on the development of capabilities and competencies.

== Goals of strategic alliances ==
- All-in-one solution
- Flexibility
- Acquisition of new customers
- Add strengths, reduce weaknesses
- Access to new markets+technologies
- Common sources
- Shared risk

== Advantages/disadvantages ==
=== Advantages ===
For companies there are many reasons to enter a strategic alliance:

- Shared risk: partnerships allow the companies involved to offset their market exposure. Strategic Alliances probably work best if the companies' portfolios complement each other, but do not directly compete.
- Shared knowledge: sharing skills (distribution, marketing, management), brands, market knowledge, technical know-how and assets leads to synergistic effects, which result in pool of resources which is more valuable than the separated single resources in the particular company.
- Opportunities for growth: using partners' distribution networks in combination with taking advantage of a good brand image can help a company to grow faster than it would on its own. The organic growth of a company might often be insufficient to satisfy the strategic requirements of a company, that means that a firm often cannot grow and extend itself fast enough without expertise and support from partners
- Speed to market: speed to market is an essential success factor In nowadays competitive markets and the right partner can help to distinctly improve this.
- Managing complexity: as complexity increases, it is more and more difficult to manage all requirements and challenges a company has to face, so pooling of expertise and knowledge can help to best serve customers.
- Innovation: the parties in an alliance can jointly determine their mutual desired outcomes and craft a collaborative contract that features incentives designed to spur investments in innovation.
- Costs: partnerships can help to lower costs, especially in non-profit areas like research and development.
- Access to resources: partners in a strategic alliance can help each other by giving access to resources, (personnel, finances, technology) which enable the partner to produce its products in a higher quality or more cost efficient way.
- Access to target markets: sometimes, collaboration with a local partner is the only way to enter a specific market. Especially developing countries want to avoid that their resources are exploited, which makes it hard for foreign companies to enter these markets alone.
- Economies of scale: when companies pool their resources and enable each other to access manufacturing capabilities, economies of scale can be achieved. Cooperating with appropriate strategies also allows smaller enterprises to work together and to compete against large competitors.
- regulatory requirements: When entering a foreign country, organisations sometimes face regulation constraints which can be reduced by forming a strategic alliance with a host-country organization.

=== Further advantages of strategic alliances ===
- Access to new technology, intellectual property rights
- Create critical mass, common standards, new businesses
- Diversification
- Improve agility, R&D, material flow, speed to market
- Reduce administrative costs, R&D costs, and cycle time
- Allowing each partner to concentrate on their competitive advantage
- Learning from partners and developing competencies that may be more widely exploited elsewhere
- To reduce political risk while entering into a new market
- An alliance plan will provide the opportunity to manage and achieve defined results from a corporate ecosystems

=== Disadvantages ===
Disadvantages of strategic alliances include:

- Sharing: In a strategic alliance the partners must share resources and profits and often skills and know-how. This can be critical if business secrets are included in this knowledge. Agreements can protect these secrets but the partner might not be willing to stick to such an agreement.
- Creating a competitor: The partner in a strategic alliance might become a competitor one day, if it profited enough from the alliance and grew enough to end the partnership and then is able to operate on its own in the same market segment.
- Opportunity costs: Focusing and committing is necessary to run a Strategic Alliance successfully but might discourage from taking other opportunities, which might be beneficial as well.
- Uneven alliances: When the decision powers are distributed unevenly, the weaker partner might be forced to act according to the will of the more powerful partner(s), even if he or she is actually not willing to do so.
- Foreign confiscation: If a company is engaged in a foreign country, there is the risk that the government of this country might try to seize this local business so that the domestic company can have all the market on its own.
- Risk of losing control over proprietary information, especially regarding complex transactions requiring extensive coordination and intensive information sharing.
- Coordination difficulties due to informal cooperation settings and highly costly dispute resolution.

== Success factors ==
The success of any alliance very much depends on how effectively the capabilities of the involved enterprises are matched and whether the full commitment of each partner to the alliance is achieved. There is no partnership without trade-offs, but the benefits of it must preponderate the disadvantages, because alliances are made to fill gaps in each others´capabilities and capacities. Poor alignment of objectives, performance metrics, and a clash of corporate cultures can weaken and constrain the effectiveness of the alliance effectiveness. Some key factors that have to be considered to be able to manage a successful alliance include:

- Understanding: The cooperating companies need a clear understanding of the potential partner's resources and interests and this understanding should be the basis for setting the alliance's goals.
- No time pressure: During negotiations time pressure must not influence the outcome of the process. Managers need time to establish a working relationship with each other, develop a time plan, set milestones, and design communication channels.
- Limited alliances: Some incompatibilities between enterprises might be unavoidable, so the number of alliances should be limited to the number necessary to enable the companies to achieve their goals.
- Good connection: Negotiations need experienced managers. The managers from large firms need to be well-connected to integrate different departments and business areas over internal borders, and they need legitimations and support from senior management.
- Creation of trust and goodwill: The best basis for a profit-yielding cooperation between enterprises is the creation of trust and goodwill, because it increases tolerance, intensity, and openness of communication, and makes the common work easier. Further, it leads to equal and satisfied partners.
- Intense relationship: Intensifying the partnership leads to the fact that partners get to know each other better, each other's interests and operating styles and increases trust.

=== Further important factors ===
- Ability to meet performance expectations
- Clear goals
- Partner compatibility
- Commitment to long-term relationship
- Alignment
- Alliance management skills
- Measuring the effectiveness of the Alliance. Balanced Scorecard is being increasingly relied upon to keep abreast of all of an alliance's tangible and intangible metrics and goals. It ensures an alliance stays on the road to achieving overarching company goals and uncovers potential obstacles before they can thwart an alliance completely.

== Risks ==
Using and operating strategic alliances does not only bring chances and benefits. There are also risks and limitations that have to be taken in consideration. Failures are often attributed to unrealistic expectations, lack of commitment, cultural differences, strategic goal divergence and insufficient trust. Some of the risks are listed below:

- Partner experiences financial difficulties
- Hidden costs
- Inefficient management
- Activities outside scope of original agreement
- Information leakage
- Loss of competencies
- Loss of operational control
- Partner lock-in
- Partner product or service failure
- Partner unable or unwilling to supply key resources
- Partner's quality performance
- Partner takes advantage of its position

The "dark side" of strategic alliances has received increasing attention across different management fields, such as business ethics, marketing, and supply chain management.

== Common mistakes ==
Many companies struggle to operate their alliances in the way they imagined it and many of these partnerships fail to reach their defined goals. Some common mistakes are:

- Low commitment
- Inappropriate company culture
- Poor operating/planning integration
- Strategic weakness
- Rigidity/poor adaptability
- Too-strong focus on internal alliance issues instead on customer value
- Not enough preparation time
- Hidden agenda leading to distrust, lack of value created negotiation
- Lack of understanding of what is involved
- Unrealistic expectations
- Wrong expectation of public perception leading to damage of reputation
- Underestimated complexity
- Reactive behavior instead of prepared, proactive actions
- Overdependence
- Legal problems

== Importance of strategic alliances ==
Strategic alliances have developed from an option to a necessity in many markets and industries. Variation in markets and requirements leads to an increasing use of strategic alliances. It is of essential importance to integrate strategic alliance management into the overall corporate strategy to advance products and services, enter new markets and leverage technology and Research & Development. Nowadays, global companies have many alliances on inland markets as well as global partnerships, sometimes even with competitors, which leads to challenges such as keeping up competition or protecting own interests while managing the alliance. So nowadays managing an alliance focuses on leveraging the differences to create value for the customer, dealing with internal challenges, managing daily competition of the alliance with competitors and Risk Management which has become a company-wide concern. The percentage of revenues for the top 1000 U.S. public corporations generated by strategic alliances increased from 3-6% in the 1990s to 40% in 2010, which shows the fast changing necessity to align in partnerships. The number of equity-based alliances has dramatically increased in the last couple of years, whereas the number of acquisitions has decreased by 65% since the year 2000. For a statistically examination over 3000 announced alliances in the USA have been reviewed in the years 1997 to 1997 and results showed that only 25% of these alliances were equity based. In the years 2000 to 2002 this percentage increased up to 62% equity-based alliances among 2500 newly formed alliances.

== Life cycle of a strategic alliance ==
=== Analysis and selection ===
In the analysis phase performance goals for the partnership are defined. These goals are used to determine the broad operational capabilities that will be required. In the selection phase those performance goals are used as some of the criteria to evaluate and select potential alliance partners. In addition, partner selection criteria can be categorised as being either task-related, or partner-related. Task-related selection criteria are associated with the operational skills and resources required for the competitive success of a venture. Partner-related criteria are associated with the efficiency and effectiveness of partner cooperation. The activities most often associated with the analysis phase are:

- Outline tentative performance goals
- Establish preliminary requirements and measures
- Gather internal and external benchmarking data
- Develop summary of performance objectives

The activities most often associated with the selection phase are:

- Develop the ideal partner profile
- Create initial list of potential partners
- Establish and Communicate the selection process
- Check references
- Conduct interviews
- Conduct due diligence
- Make the selection

=== Formation ===
Forming a strategic alliance is a process which usually implies some major steps that are mentioned below:

- Strategy development: In this stage the possibility of a strategic alliance is examined with respect to objectives, major issues, resource strategies for production, technology and people. The objectives of the company and of the alliance must be compatible.
- Partner assessment: In this phase potential partners for the strategic alliance are analyzed, in order to find an appropriate company to cooperate with. A company must know the weaknesses and strengths and the motivation for joining an alliance of another company. Besides that appropriate criteria for the partner selection are defined and strategies are developed how to accommodate the partner's management style.
- Contract negotiations: After having selected the right partner for a strategic alliance the contract negotiations start. At first all parties involved discuss if their goals and objectives are realistic and feasible. Dedicated negotiation teams are formed which determine each partner's role in the alliance like contribution and reward, penalties and retaining companies´ interests.

=== Operation ===
In this phase in the life of a strategic alliance, an internal structure occurs under which its functions develop. While operating it, the alliance becomes an own new organization itself with members from the origin companies with the aim of meeting all previously set objectives and improving the overall performance of the alliance which requires effective structures and processes and a good, strong and reliable leadership. Budges have to be linked, as well as resources which are strategically most important and the performance of the alliance has to be measured and assessed.

=== Alliance structuring and governance ===
This phase focuses on creating frameworks both legally and organizational for the strategic alliance relationship, on agreeing and finalizing operational plans, making sure that key leadership is in place, and creating a formula for risk-and-reward that will motivates both parties to make the relationship a success. This phase ends with the contract being signed. Steps include:

- Governance, integration, and control
- Organizational structure and support
- Win-win business analysis
- Legal agreements

=== End/development ===
There are several ways that a strategic alliance can come to an end:

- Natural end: When the objectives the strategic alliance was founded for have been achieved, and no further cooperation is necessary or beneficial for the involved enterprises the alliance can come to a natural end. An example for such a natural end is the alliance between Dassault and British Aerospace which was founded to manufacture the Jaguar fighter aircraft. After the end of the program no further jets were ordered so the involved companies ended their cooperation.
- Extension: After the end of the actual reason for the alliance, the cooperating enterprises decide to extend the cooperation for following generations of a respective product or expand the alliance to new products or projects. Renault for example worked together with Matra on three successive generations of their Espace minivan, whereas Airbus expanded its cooperation to include a complete family of airplanes.
- Premature termination: In this case the Strategic Alliance is ended before the actual objectives of its existence have been achieved. In 1987 Matra-Harris and Intel broke up their Cimatel partnership before one of the planned VLSI chips was manufactured.
- Exclusive continuation: If one partner decides to get out of the alliance before the common goals have been achieved, the other partner can decide to continue the project on its own. This happened when Saab decided to continue with the designing of a commuter aircraft (SF-340), after the partner Fairchild had to cancel the alliance because of internal problems. After Fairchild left the project it was named Saab 340.
- Takeover of partner: Many equity alliances end by mergers and acquisitions that one partner buys out the stake of the other partner. This may even have been foreseen from the very beginning to grant an sales and/or put option. Strong companies sometimes have the opportunity to take over smaller partners. If one firm acquires another the strategic alliance comes to an end. After almost ten years of cooperation in the field of mainframe computers a British computer manufacturer, named ICL, was taken over by Fujitsu in 1990.
