= Upstream and downstream (transduction) =

Sewage Treatment Plant

The extracellular type II and type I kinase receptors binding to the TGF-β ligands.

The type II receptors phosphorylate the type I receptors; the type I receptors are then enabled to phosphorylate cytoplasmic R-Smads, which then act as transcriptional regulators.

The upstream signaling pathway is triggered by the binding of a signaling molecule, a ligand, to a receiving molecule, a receptor. Receptors and ligands exist in many different forms, and only recognize/bond to particular molecules. Upstream extracellular signaling transduce a variety of intracellular cascades.

Receptors and ligands are common upstream signaling molecules that dictate the downstream elements of the signal pathway. A plethora of different factors affect which ligands bind to which receptors and the downstream cellular response that they initiate.

== TGF-β ==
The extracellular type II and type I kinase receptors binding to the TGF-β ligands. Transforming growth factor-β (TGF-β) is a superfamily of cytokines that play a significant upstream role in regulating of morphogenesis, homeostasis, cell proliferation, and differentiation. The significance of TGF-β is apparent with the human diseases that occur when TGF-β processes are disrupted, such as cancer, and skeletal, intestinal and cardiovascular diseases. TGF-β is pleiotropic and multifunctional, meaning they are able to act on a wide variety of cell types.

=== Mechanism ===
The effects of transforming growth factor-β (TGF-β) are determined by cellular context. There are three kinds of contextual factors that determine the shape the TGF-β response: the signal transduction components, the transcriptional cofactors and the epigenetic state of the cell. The different ligands and receptors of TGF-β are significant as well in the composition signal transduction pathway.

- the signal transduction components: ligand isoforms, ligand traps, co-receptors, receptor sub-types, inhibitory SMAD proteins, crosstalk inputs
- the transcriptional cofactors of SMAD proteins: pluripotency factors, lineage regulators, DNA-binding cofactors, HATs and HDACs, SNF, chromatin readers
- the epigenetic factors: heterochromatin, pluripotency marks, lineage marks, EMT marks, iPS cell marks, oncogenic marks.

=== Upstream pathway ===
The type II receptors phosphorylate the type I receptors; the type I receptors are then enabled to phosphorylate cytoplasmic R-Smads, which then act as transcriptional regulators. Signaling is initiated by the binding of TGF-β to its serine/threonine receptors. The serene/threonine receptors are the type II and type I receptors on the cell membrane. Binding of a TGF-β members induces assembly of a heterotetrameric complex of two type I and two type II receptors at the plasma membrane. Individual members of the TGF-β family bind to a certain set of characteristic combination of these type I and type II receptors. The type I receptors can be divided into two groups, which depends on the cytoplasmic R-Smads that they bind and phosphorylate. The first group of type I receptors (Alk1/2/3/6) bind and activate the R-Smads, Smad1/5/8. The second group of type I reactors (Alk4/5/7) act on the R-Smads, Smad2/3. The phosphorylated R-Smads then form complexes and the signals are funneled through two regulatory Smad (R-Smad) channels (Smad1/5/8 or Smad2/3). After the ligand-receptor complexes phosphorylate the cytoplasmic R-Smads, the signal is then sent through Smad 1/5/8 or Smad 2/3. This leads to the downstream signal cascade and cellular gene targeting.

=== Downstream pathway ===
TGF-β regulates multiple downstream processes and cellular functions. The pathway is highly variable based on cellular context. TGF-β downstream signaling cascade includes regulation of cell growth, cell proliferation, cell differentiation, and apoptosis.

== See also ==
- Upstream and downstream (DNA)
