= Upstream and downstream (DNA) =

Terms meaning relative to the direction that transcription takes place

In molecular biology and genetics, upstream and downstream both refer to relative positions of genetic code in DNA or RNA. Each strand of DNA or RNA has a 5' end and a 3' end, so named for the carbon position on the deoxyribose (or ribose) ring. By convention, upstream and downstream relate to the 5' to 3' direction respectively in which RNA transcription takes place. Upstream is toward the 5' end of the RNA molecule, and downstream is toward the 3' end. When considering double-stranded DNA, upstream is toward the 5' end of the coding strand for the gene in question and downstream is toward the 3' end. Due to the anti-parallel nature of DNA, this means the 3' end of the template strand is upstream of the gene and the 5' end is downstream.

Some genes on the same DNA molecule may be transcribed in opposite directions. This means the upstream and downstream areas of the molecule may change depending on which gene is used as the reference.

The terms upstream and downstream are sometimes also applied to a polypeptide sequence, where upstream refers to a region N-terminal and downstream to residues C-terminal of a reference point.

== See also ==
- Directionality (molecular biology)
- Upstream and downstream (transduction)
