= List of ISO standards 5000–7999 =

This is a list of published (Note: This list generally excludes draft versions.) International Organization for Standardization (ISO) standards and other deliverables. (Note: ISO deliverables include "specifications" (ISO/PAS, ISO/TS), "reports" (ISO/TR), etc, which are not referred to by ISO as "standards".) For a complete and up-to-date list of all the ISO standards, see the ISO catalogue.

The standards are protected by copyright and most of them must be purchased. However, about 300 of the standards produced by ISO and IEC's Joint Technical Committee 1 (JTC 1) have been made freely and publicly available.

== ISO 5000 – ISO 7999 ==
- ISO 5006:2017 Earth-moving machinery - Operator's field of view - Test method and performance criteria
- ISO 5010:2007 Earth-moving machinery - Rubber-tyred machines - Steering requirements
- ISO 5011:2014 Inlet air cleaning equipment for internal combustion engines and compressors - Performance testing
- ISO 5053 Industrial trucks – Terminology and classification
  - ISO 5053-1:2015 Part 1: Types of industrial trucks
- ISO/IEC 5055:2021 Information technology — Software measurement — Software quality measurement — Automated source code quality measures
- ISO 5122:1979 Documentation - Abstract sheets in serial publications
- ISO 5123:1984 Documentation - Headers for microfiche of monographs and serials
- ISO 5127:2017 Information and documentation - Foundation and vocabulary
- ISO 5128:1980 Acoustics – Measurement of noise inside motor vehicles
- ISO 5129:2001 Acoustics - Measurement of sound pressure levels in the interior of aircraft during flight
- ISO 5130:2007 Acoustics – Measurements of sound pressure level emitted by stationary road vehicles
- ISO 5131:2015 Tractors for agriculture and forestry – Measurement of noise at the operator's position – Survey method
- ISO 5135:1997 Acoustics – Determination of sound power levels of noise from air-terminal devices, air-terminal units, dampers and valves by measurement in a reverberation room
- ISO 5136:2003 Acoustics – Determination of sound power radiated into a duct by fans and other air-moving devices – In-duct method
- ISO 5138 Office machines - Vocabulary
  - ISO 5138-1:1978 Part 1: Dictation equipment
  - ISO 5138-2:1980 Part 2: Duplicators
  - ISO 5138-3:1981 Part 3: Addressing machines
  - ISO 5138-4:1981 Part 4: Letter opening machines
  - ISO 5138-5:1981 Part 5: Letter folding machines
  - ISO 5138-7:1986 Part 7: Postal franking machines
  - ISO 5138-9:1984 Part 9: Typewriters
- ISO 5167 Measurement of fluid flow by means of pressure differential devices inserted in circular cross-section conduits running full
  - ISO 5167-1:2003 Part 1: General principles and requirements
  - ISO 5167-2:2003 Part 2: Orifice plates
  - ISO 5167-3:2003 Part 3: Nozzles and Venturi nozzles
  - ISO 5167-4:2003 Part 4: Venturi tubes
  - ISO 5167-5:2016 Part 5: Cone meters
  - ISO 5167-6:2019 Part 6: Wedge meters
- ISO 5168:2005 Measurement of fluid flow – Procedures for the evaluation of uncertainties
- ISO 5211:2017 Industrial valves - Part-turn actuator attachments
- ISO/IEC 5218:2004 Information technology — Codes for the representation of human sexes
- ISO/IEC 5230:2020 Information technology — OpenChain Specification
- ISO 5232:1998 Graphical symbols for textile machinery
- ISO 5234:2005 Textile machinery and accessories – Metallic card clothing – Definitions of dimensions, types and mounting
- ISO 5237:1978 Textile machinery and accessories — Cones for yarn winding (cross wound) — Half angle of the cone 5 degrees 57' [Withdrawn: replaced with ISO 8489-5]
- ISO 5238 Textile machinery and accessories – Packages of yarns and intermediate products
  - ISO 5238-1:1982 Part 1: Terminology
- ISO 5239:1980 Textile machinery and accessories – Winding – Basic terms
- ISO 5247 Textile machinery and accessories – Weaving machines
  - ISO 5247-1:2004 Part 1: Vocabulary and classification
  - ISO 5247-3:1993 Part 3: Parts of the machine – Vocabulary
- ISO 5248:2003 Textile machinery and accessories – Dyeing and finishing machinery – Vocabulary for ancillary devices
- ISO 5250:2003 Textile machinery and accessories – Dyeing and finishing machinery – Terms for tentering and heat-treatment machinery
- ISO 5261:1995 Technical drawings – Simplified representation of bars and profile sections
- ISO 5284:1986 Conveyor belts – List of equivalent terms
- ISO 5288:2001 Synchronous belt drives - Vocabulary
- ISO 5323:1984 Solid wood parquet and raw parquet blocks – Vocabulary
- ISO 5329:1978 Solid wood paving blocks – Vocabulary
- ISO 5344:2004 Electrodynamic vibration generating systems – Performance characteristics
- ISO 5347 Methods for the calibration of vibration and shock pick-ups
  - ISO 5347-8:1993 Part 8: Primary calibration by dual centrifuge
  - ISO 5347-12:1993 Part 12: Testing of transverse shock sensitivity
  - ISO 5347-13:1993 Part 13: Testing of base strain sensitivity
  - ISO 5347-15:1993 Part 15: Testing of acoustic sensitivity
  - ISO 5347-16:1993 Part 16: Testing of mounting torque sensitivity
  - ISO 5347-17:1993 Part 17: Testing of fixed temperature sensitivity
  - ISO 5347-18:1993 Part 18: Testing of transient temperature sensitivity
  - ISO 5347-22:1997 Part 22: Accelerometer resonance testing – General methods
- ISO 5348:1998 Mechanical vibration and shock – Mechanical mounting of accelerometers
- ISO 5356 Anaesthetic and respiratory equipment – Conical connectors
  - ISO 5356-1:2015 Part 1: Cones and sockets
  - ISO 5356-2:2012 Part 2: Screw-threaded weight-bearing connectors
- ISO 5358:1992 Anaesthetic machines for use with humans
- ISO 5359:2014 Anaesthetic and respiratory equipment – Low-pressure hose assemblies for use with medical gases
- ISO 5360:2016 Anaesthetic vaporizers – Agent-specific filling systems
- ISO 5361:2016 Anaesthetic and respiratory equipment – Tracheal tubes and connectors
- ISO 5362:2006 Anaesthetic reservoir bags
- ISO 5364:2016 Anaesthetic and respiratory equipment – Oropharyngeal airways
- ISO 5366:2016 Anaesthetic and respiratory equipment – Tracheostomy tubes and connectors
- ISO 5367:2014 Anaesthetic and respiratory equipment – Breathing sets and connectors
- ISO 5391:2003 Pneumatic tools and machines - Vocabulary
- ISO 5396:1977 Hardmetal heading dies - Terminology
- ISO 5408:2009 Screw threads - Vocabulary
- ISO 5419:1982 Twist drills - Terms, definitions and types
- ISO 5420:1983 Reamers - Terms, definitions and types
- ISO 5426:1983 Information and documentation - Extension of the Latin alphabet coded character set for bibliographic information interchange (Note: The exact wording of this title varies between parts. This is the wording of the most recently published part.)
  - ISO 5426-2:1996 Part 2: Latin characters used in minor European languages and obsolete typography
- ISO 5427:1984 Extension of the Cyrillic alphabet coded character set for bibliographic information interchange
- ISO 5428:1984 Greek alphabet coded character set for bibliographic information interchange
- ISO 5436 Geometrical Product Specifications (GPS) – Surface texture: Profile method; Measurement standards
  - ISO 5436-1:2000 Part 1: Material measures
  - ISO 5436-2:2012 Part 2: Software measurement standards
- ISO 5445:1980 Ferrosilicon - Specification and conditions of delivery
- ISO 5446:2017 Ferromanganese - Specification and conditions of delivery
- ISO 5447:1980 Ferrosilicomanganese - Specification and conditions of delivery
- ISO 5448:1981 Ferrochromium - Specification and conditions of delivery
- ISO 5449:1980 Ferrosilicochromium - Specification and conditions of delivery
- ISO 5450:1980 Ferrotungsten - Specification and conditions of delivery
- ISO 5451:1980 Ferrovanadium - Specification and conditions of delivery
- ISO 5452:1980 Ferromolybdenum - Specification and conditions of delivery
- ISO 5453:1980 Ferroniobium - Specification and conditions of delivery
- ISO 5454:1980 Ferrotitanium - Specification and conditions of delivery
- ISO 5455:1979 Technical drawings – Scales
- ISO 5456 Technical drawings – Projection methods
  - ISO 5456-1:1996 Part 1: Synopsis
  - ISO 5456-2:1996 Part 2: Orthographic representations
  - ISO 5456-3:1996 Part 3: Axonometric representations
  - ISO 5456-4:1996 Part 4: Central projection
- ISO 5457:1999 Technical product documentation – Sizes and layout of drawing sheets
- ISO 5458:1998 Geometrical Product Specifications (GPS) – Geometrical tolerancing – Positional tolerancing
- ISO 5459:2011 Geometrical product specifications (GPS) – Geometrical tolerancing – Datums and datum systems
- ISO 5479:1997 Statistical interpretation of data - Tests for departure from the normal distribution
- ISO 5492:2008 Sensory analysis – Vocabulary
- ISO 5496:2006 Sensory analysis – Methodology – Initiation and training of assessors in the detection and recognition of odours
- ISO 5507:2002 Oilseeds, vegetable oils and fats – Nomenclature
- ISO 5526:2013 Cereals, pulses and other food grains – Nomenclature
- ISO 5527:2015 Cereals – Vocabulary
- ISO 5572:1987 Shipbuilding and marine structures - Numbering of equipment and structural elements in ships
- ISO 5576:1997 Non-destructive testing - Industrial X-ray and gamma-ray radiology - Vocabulary
- ISO 5577:2017 Non-destructive testing - Ultrasonic testing - Vocabulary
- ISO 5593:1997 Rolling bearings - Vocabulary
- ISO 5598:2008 Fluid power systems and components - Vocabulary
- ISO 5652:1984 Information processing – 9-Track, 12,7 mm (0.5 in) wide magnetic tape for information interchange – Format and recording, using group coding at 246 cpmm (6 250 cpi)
- ISO 5653:1980 Information processing – Interchangeable magnetic twelve-disk pack (200 Mbytes)
- ISO 5654 Information processing – Data interchange on 200 mm (8 in) flexible disk cartridges using two-frequency recording at 13 262 ftprad, 1,9 tpmm (48 tpi), on one side
  - ISO 5654-1:1984 Part 1: Dimensional, physical and magnetic characteristics
  - ISO 5654-2:1985 Part 2: Track format
- ISO 5659 Plastics - Smoke generation
  - ISO 5659-1:1996 Part 1: Guidance on optical-density testing [Withdrawn: replaced by ISO 5659-2:2012]
  - ISO 5659-2:2017 Part 2: Determination of optical density by a single-chamber test
  - ISO/TR 5659-3:1999 Part 3: Determination of optical density by a dynamic-flow method [Withdrawn, no replacement]
- ISO 5660 Reaction-to-fire tests – Heat release, smoke production and mass loss rate
  - ISO 5660-1 Heat release rate (cone calorimeter method)
  - ISO 5660-2 Smoke production rate (dynamic measurement)
  - ISO/TS 5660-3 Guidance on measurement
- ISO 5681:1992 Equipment for crop protection – Vocabulary
- ISO 5702:1983 Equipment for harvesting – Combine harvester component parts – Equivalent terms
- ISO 5725 Accuracy (trueness and precision) of measurement methods and results
  - ISO 5725-1:1994 Part 1: General principles and definitions
  - ISO 5725-2:1994 Part 2: Basic method for the determination of repeatability and reproducibility of a standard measurement method
  - ISO 5725-3:1994 Part 3: Intermediate measures of the precision of a standard measurement method
  - ISO 5725-4:1994 Part 4: Basic methods for the determination of the trueness of a standard measurement method
  - ISO 5725-5:1998 Part 5: Alternative methods for the determination of the precision of a standard measurement method
  - ISO 5725-6:1994 Part 6: Use in practice of accuracy values
- ISO 5742:2004 Pliers and nippers - Nomenclature
- ISO 5775 Bicycle tires and rims
- ISO 5776 Graphic technology - Symbols for text correction
- ISO 5800:2001 Photography – Colour negative films for still photography – Determination of ISO speed
- ISO 5806:1984 Information processing - Specification of single-hit decision tables
- ISO 5807:1985 Information processing - Documentation symbols and conventions for data, program and system flowcharts, program network charts and system resources charts
- ISO 5826:2014 Resistance welding equipment – Transformers – General specifications applicable to all transformers
- ISO 5832 Implants for surgery – Metallic materials
  - ISO 5832-1:2016 Part 1: Wrought stainless steel
  - ISO 5832-2:1999 Part 2: Unalloyed titanium
  - ISO 5832-3:2016 Part 3: Wrought titanium 6-aluminium 4-vanadium alloy
  - ISO 5832-4:2014 Part 4: Cobalt-chromium-molybdenum casting alloy
  - ISO 5832-5:2005 Part 5: Wrought cobalt-chromium-tungsten-nickel alloy
  - ISO 5832-6:1997 Part 6: Wrought cobalt-nickel-chromium-molybdenum alloy
  - ISO 5832-7:2016 Part 7: Forgeable and cold-formed cobalt-chromium-nickel-molybdenum-iron alloy
  - ISO 5832-8:1997 Part 8: Wrought cobalt-nickel-chromium-molybdenum- tungsten-iron alloy
  - ISO 5832-9:2007 Part 9: Wrought high nitrogen stainless steel
  - ISO 5832-11:2014 Part 11: Wrought titanium 6-aluminium 7-niobium alloy
  - ISO 5832-12:2007 Part 12: Wrought cobalt-chromium-molybdenum alloy
  - ISO 5832-14:2007 Part 14: Wrought titanium 15-molybdenum 5-zirconium 3-aluminium alloy
- ISO 5833:2002 Implants for surgery – Acrylic resin cements
- ISO 5834 Implants for surgery – Ultra-high-molecular-weight polyethylene
  - ISO 5834-1:2005 Part 1: Powder form
  - ISO 5834-2:2011 Part 2: Moulded forms
  - ISO 5834-3:2005 Part 3: Accelerated ageing methods
  - ISO 5834-4:2005 Part 4: Oxidation index measurement method
  - ISO 5834-5:2005 Part 5: Morphology assessment method
- ISO 5835:1991 Implants for surgery – Metal bone screws with hexagonal drive connection, spherical under-surface of head, asymmetrical thread – Dimensions
- ISO 5836:1988 Implants for surgery – Metal bone plates – Holes corresponding to screws with asymmetrical thread and spherical under-surface
- ISO 5837 Implants for surgery – Intramedullary nailing systems
  - ISO 5837-1:1985 Part 1: Intramedullary nails with cloverleaf or V-shaped cross-section
- ISO 5838 Implants for surgery – Metallic skeletal pins and wires
  - ISO 5838-1:2013 Part 1: General requirements
  - ISO 5838-2:1991 Part 2: Steinmann skeletal pins – Dimensions
  - ISO 5838-3:1993 Part 3: Kirschner skeletal wires
- ISO 5840 Cardiovascular implants – Cardiac valve prostheses
  - ISO 5840-1:2015 Part 1: General requirements
  - ISO 5840-2:2015 Part 2: Surgically implanted heart valve substitutes
  - ISO 5840-3:2013 Part 3: Heart valve substitutes implanted by transcatheter techniques
- ISO 5841 Implants for surgery – Cardiac pacemakers
  - ISO 5841-2:2014 Part 2: Reporting of clinical performance of populations of pulse generators or leads
  - ISO 5841-3:2013 Part 3: Low-profile connectors (IS-1) for implantable pacemakers
- ISO 5843 Aerospace - List of equivalent terms
  - ISO 5843-1:1985 Part 1: Aerospace electrical equipment
  - ISO 5843-2:1990 Part 2: Aerospace rivets
  - ISO 5843-3:1997 Part 3: Aerospace bolts and nuts
  - ISO 5843-4:1990 Part 4: Flight dynamics
  - ISO 5843-5:1990 Part 5: Environmental and operating conditions for aircraft equipment
  - ISO 5843-6:1985 Part 6: Standard atmosphere
  - ISO 5843-8:1988 Part 8: Aircraft reliability
  - ISO 5843-9:1988 Part 9: Aircraft
  - ISO 5843-10:1988 Part 10: Aircraft structure
- ISO 5845 Technical drawings – Simplified representation of the assembly of parts with fasteners
  - ISO 5845-1:1995 Part 1: General principles
  - ISO 5845-2:1995 Part 2: Rivets for aerospace equipment
- ISO 5859:2014 Aerospace series - Graphic symbols for schematic drawings of hydraulic and pneumatic systems and components
- ISO 5878:1982 Reference atmospheres for aerospace use
- ISO 5893 Rubber and plastics test equipment – Tensile, flexural and compression types (constant rate of traverse) – Specification
- ISO 5963:1985 Documentation - Methods for examining documents, determining their subjects, and selecting indexing terms
- ISO 5964 Documentation – Guidelines for the establishment and development of multilingual thesauri
- ISO 5967:1981 Taps and thread cutting - Nomenclature of the main types and terminology
- ISO 5968:1981 Circular screwing dies - Terminology
- ISO 5971:1981 Size designation of clothes – Pantyhose
- ISO 5989:1995 Photography - Pre-packaged chemicals for the processing of silver halide based photographic materials - Vocabulary
- ISO 5993 Sodium hydroxide for industrial use—Determination of mercury content—Flameless atomic absorption spectrometric method
- ISO 6009:2016 Hypodermic needles for single use – Colour coding for identification
- ISO 6011:2003 Earth-moving machinery – Visual display of machine operation
- ISO 6050:1987 Shipbuilding - Bulbous bow and side thruster symbols
- ISO 6068:1985 Information processing – Recording characteristics of instrumentation magnetic tape (including telemetry systems) – Interchange requirements
- ISO 6070:1981 Auxiliary tables for vibration generators – Methods of describing equipment characteristics
- ISO 6078:1982 Black tea – Vocabulary
- ISO 6093:1985 Information processing - Representation of numerical values in character strings for information interchange
- ISO 6098:1984 Information processing – Self-loading cartridges for 12,7 mm (0.5 in) wide magnetic tape
- ISO 6107 Water quality—Vocabulary
  - ISO 6107-1:2004 (No part title)
  - ISO 6107-2:2006 (No part title)
  - ISO 6107-3:1993 (No part title)
  - ISO 6107-4:1993 (No part title)
  - ISO 6107-5:2004 (No part title)
  - ISO 6107-6:2004 (No part title)
  - ISO 6107-7:2006 (No part title)
  - ISO 6107-8:1993 (No part title)
  - ISO 6107-9:1997 Part 9: Alphabetical list and subject index
- ISO 6152:1982 Thermometers for use with alcoholometers and alcohol hydrometers
- ISO 6160:1979 Programming languages - PL/1
- ISO 6165:2012 Earth-moving machinery – Basic types – Identification and terms and definitions
- ISO 6166:2013 Securities and related financial instruments – International securities identification numbering system (ISIN)
- ISO 6173:1982 Open-end spinning machines – Vocabulary
- ISO 6188:1986 Plastics — Poly(alkylene terephthalate) granules — Determination of water content [Withdrawn: replaced with ISO 15512]
- ISO 6194 Rotary-shaft lip-type seals incorporating elastomeric sealing elements
  - ISO 6194-2:2009 Part 2: Vocabulary
  - ISO 6194-5 Identification of visual imperfections
- ISO 6196 Micrographics - Vocabulary
  - ISO 6196-1:1993 Part 1: General terms
  - ISO 6196-2:1993 Part 2: Image positions and methods of recording
  - ISO 6196-3:1997 Part 3: Film processing
  - ISO 6196-4:1998 Part 4: Materials and packaging
  - ISO 6196-5:1987 Part 5: Quality of images, legibility, inspection
  - ISO 6196-6:1992 Part 6: Equipment
  - ISO 6196-7:1992 Part 7: Computer micrographics
  - ISO 6196-8:1998 Part 8: Use
  - ISO 6196-10:1999 Part 10: Index
- ISO 6206:1979 Chemical products for industrial use – Sampling – Vocabulary
- ISO 6217:1982 Shipbuilding – Inland navigation – Pilot craft – Identification painting and inscriptions
- ISO 6222:1999 Water quality – Enumeration of culturable micro-organisms – Colony count by inoculation in a nutrient agar culture medium
- ISO 6284:1996 Construction drawings – Indication of limit deviations
- ISO 6289:2003 Skis – Vocabulary
- ISO 6336 Calculation of load capacity of spur and helical gears
- ISO 6344 Coated abrasives – Grain size analysis
- ISO 6345:1990 Shipbuilding and marine structures – Windows and side scuttles – Vocabulary
- ISO 6346 Freight containers – Coding, identification and marking
- ISO 6348:1980 Textiles – Determination of mass – Vocabulary
- ISO 6352:1985 Ferronickel - Determination of nickel content - Dimethylglyoxime gravimetric method
- ISO 6354:1982 Adhesives – Vocabulary [Withdrawn: replaced with ISO 472]
- ISO 6355:1988 Textile glass – Vocabulary [Withdrawn: replaced with ISO 472]
- ISO 6357:1985 Documentation – Spine titles on books and other publications
- ISO 6372:2017 Nickel and nickel alloys – Terms and definitions
- ISO 6385:2016 Ergonomics principles in the design of work systems
- ISO 6393:2008 Earth-moving machinery – Determination of sound power level – Stationary test conditions
- ISO 6394:2008 Earth-moving machinery – Determination of emission sound pressure level at operator's position – Stationary test conditions
- ISO 6395:2008 Earth-moving machinery – Determination of sound power level – Dynamic test conditions
- ISO 6396:2008 Earth-moving machinery – Determination of emission sound pressure level at operator's position – Dynamic test conditions
- ISO 6405 Earth-moving machinery - Symbols for operator controls and other displays
  - ISO 6405-1:2017 Part 1: Common symbols
  - ISO 6405-2:2017 Part 2: Symbols for specific machines, equipment and accessories
- ISO 6410 Technical drawings – Screw threads and threaded parts
  - ISO 6410-1:1993 Part 1: General conventions
  - ISO 6410-2:1993 Part 2: Screw thread inserts
  - ISO 6410-3:1993 Part 3: Simplified representation
- ISO 6411:1982 Technical drawings – Simplified representation of centre holes
- ISO 6412 Technical drawings – Simplified representation of pipelines
  - ISO 6412-1:2017 Part 1: General rules and orthogonal representation
  - ISO 6412-2:2017 Part 2: Isometric projection
  - ISO 6412-3:2017 Part 3: Terminal features of ventilation and drainage systems
- ISO 6413:1988 Technical drawings – Representation of splines and serrations
- ISO 6414:1982 Technical drawings for glassware
- ISO 6416:2017 Hydrometry – Measurement of discharge by the ultrasonic transit time (time of flight) method
- ISO 6420:2016 Hydrometry – Position fixing equipment for hydrometric boats
- ISO 6421:2012 Hydrometry – Methods for assessment of reservoir sedimentation
- ISO 6422 Layout key for trade documents
  - ISO 6422-1:2010 Part 1: Paper-based documents
- ISO 6425:1996 Divers' watches
- ISO 6426 Horological vocabulary
  - ISO 6426-1:1982 Part 1: Technical and scientific definitions
  - ISO 6426-2:2002 Part 2: Technical and commercial definitions
- ISO 6428:1982 Technical drawings – Requirements for microcopying
- ISO/IEC 6429:1992 Information technology – Control functions for coded character sets
- ISO 6433:2012 Technical product documentation – Part references
- ISO 6438:1983 Documentation – African coded character set for bibliographic information interchange
- ISO 6461 Water quality – Detection and enumeration of the spores of sulfite-reducing anaerobes (clostridia)
  - ISO 6461-1:1986 Part 1: Method by enrichment in a liquid medium
  - ISO 6461-2:1986 Part 2: Method by membrane filtration
- ISO 6467:1980 Ferrovanadium - Determination of vanadium content - Potentiometric method
- ISO 6472:2017 Rubber compounding ingredients – Abbreviated terms
- ISO 6474 Implants for surgery – Ceramic materials
  - ISO 6474-1:2010 Part 1: Ceramic materials based on high purity alumina
  - ISO 6474-2:2012 Part 2: Composite materials based on a high-purity alumina matrix with zirconia reinforcement
- ISO 6475:1989 Implants for surgery – Metal bone screws with asymmetrical thread and spherical under-surface – Mechanical requirements and test methods
- ISO 6501:1988 Ferronickel - Specification and delivery requirements
- ISO 6512:1982 Building construction — Modular coordination — Storey heights and room heights [Withdrawn: replaced with ISO 21723]
- ISO 6513:1982 Building construction — Modular coordination — Series of preferred multimodular sizes for horizontal dimensions [Withdrawn: replaced with ISO 21723]
- ISO 6514:1982 Building construction — Modular coordination — Sub-modular increments [Withdrawn: replaced with ISO 21723]
- ISO 6518 Road vehicles – Ignition systems
  - ISO 6518-1:2002 Part 1: Vocabulary
- ISO/IEC 6522:1992 Information technology - Programming languages - PL/1 general purpose subset
- ISO/IEC 6523 Information technology – Structure for the identification of organizations and organization parts
- ISO 6531:2017 Machinery for forestry – Portable chain-saws – Vocabulary
- ISO 6552:1980 Automatic steam traps - Definition of technical terms
- ISO 6579 Microbiology of the food chain – Horizontal method for the detection, enumeration and serotyping of Salmonella
  - ISO 6579-1:2017 Part 1: Detection of Salmonella spp.
  - ISO/TS 6579-2:2012 Part 2: Enumeration by a miniaturized most probable number technique
  - ISO/TR 6579-3:2014 Part 3: Guidelines for serotyping of Salmonella spp.
- ISO 6586:1980 Data processing - Implementation of the ISO 7- bit and 8- bit coded character sets on punched cards
- ISO 6590 Packaging – Sacks – Vocabulary and types
  - ISO 6590-1:1983 Part 1: Paper sacks
  - ISO 6590-2:1986 Part 2: Sacks made from thermoplastic flexible film
- ISO 6594 Cast iron drainage pipes and fittings – Spigot series
- ISO 6596 Information processing – Data interchange on 130 mm (5.25 in) flexible disk cartridges using two-frequency recording at 7 958 ftprad, 1.9 tpmm (48 tpi), on one side
  - ISO 6596-1:1985 Part 1: Dimensional, physical and magnetic characteristics
  - ISO 6596-2:1985 Part 2: Track format
- ISO 6611:2004 Milk and milk products – Enumeration of colony-forming units of yeasts and/or moulds – Colony-count technique at 25 degrees C
- ISO 6621 Internal combustion engines – Piston rings
  - ISO 6621-1:2007 Part 1: Vocabulary
- ISO 6630:1986 Documentation - Bibliographic control characters
- ISO 6689 Equipment for harvesting – Combines and functional components
  - ISO 6689-1:1997 Part 1: Vocabulary
- ISO 6706:1981 Plastics laboratory ware – Graduated measuring cylinders
- ISO 6707 Buildings and civil engineering works – Vocabulary
  - ISO 6707-1:2014 Part 1: General terms
  - ISO 6707-2:2014 Part 2: Contract terms
  - ISO 6707-3:2017 Part 3: Sustainability terms
- ISO 6709:2008 Standard representation of geographic point location by coordinates
- ISO 6710:2017 Single-use containers for human venous blood specimen collection
- ISO 6725:1981 Road vehicles – Dimensions of two-wheeled mopeds and motorcycles – Terms and definitions
- ISO 6726:1988 Mopeds and motorcycles with two wheels – Masses – Vocabulary
- ISO 6727:2012 Road vehicles - Motorcycles - Symbols for controls, indicators and tell-tales
- ISO 6730:2005 Milk – Enumeration of colony-forming units of psychrotrophic microorganisms – Colony-count technique at 6,5 degrees C
- ISO 6747:2013 Earth-moving machinery – Dozers – Terminology and commercial specifications
- ISO 6780:2003 Flat pallets for intercontinental materials handling — Principal dimensions and tolerances, reviewed and confirmed 2014
- ISO 6798:1995 Reciprocating internal combustion engines – Measurement of emitted airborne noise – Engineering method and survey method
- ISO 6811:1998 Spherical plain bearings - Vocabulary
- ISO 6813:1998 Road vehicles – Collision classification – Terminology
- ISO 6814:2009 Machinery for forestry – Mobile and self-propelled machinery – Terms, definitions and classification
- ISO 6861:1996 Information and documentation - Glagolitic alphabet coded character set for bibliographic information interchange
- ISO 6862:1996 Information and documentation - Mathematical coded character set for bibliographic information interchange
- ISO 6871 Dental base metal casting alloys
  - ISO 6871-1:1994 Part 1: Cobalt-based alloys [Withdrawn: replaced with ISO 22674]
  - ISO 6871-2:1994 Part 2: Nickel-based alloys [Withdrawn: replaced with ISO 22674]
- ISO 6883:2017 Animal and vegetable fats and oils - Determination of conventional mass per volume (litre weight in air)
- ISO 6887 Microbiology of the food chain - Preparation of test samples, initial suspension and decimal dilutions for microbiological examination
  - ISO 6887-1:2017 Part 1: General rules for the preparation of the initial suspension and decimal dilutions
  - ISO 6887-2:2017 Part 2: Specific rules for the preparation of meat and meat products
  - ISO 6887-3:2017 Part 3: Specific rules for the preparation of fish and fishery products
  - ISO 6887-4:2017 Part 4: Specific rules for the preparation of miscellaneous products
  - ISO 6887-5:2010 Part 5: Specific rules for the preparation of milk and milk products
  - ISO 6887-6:2013 Part 6: Specific rules for the preparation of samples taken at the primary production stage
- ISO 6888 Microbiology of food and animal feeding stuffs – Horizontal method for the enumeration of coagulase-positive staphylococci (Staphylococcus aureus and other species)
  - ISO 6888-1:1999 Part 1: Technique using Baird-Parker agar medium
  - ISO 6888-2:1999 Part 2: Technique using rabbit plasma fibrinogen agar medium
  - ISO 6888-3:2003 Part 3: Detection and MPN technique for low numbers
- ISO 6892 Metallic materials – Tensile testing
  - ISO 6892-1 Method of test at room temperature
  - ISO 6892-2 Method of test at elevated temperature
  - ISO 6892-3 Method of test at low temperature
  - ISO 6892-4 Method of test in liquid helium
- ISO 6926:2016 Acoustics – Requirements for the performance and calibration of reference sound sources used for the determination of sound power levels
- ISO 6927:2012 Buildings and civil engineering works – Sealants – Vocabulary
- ISO 6929:2013 Steel products – Vocabulary
- ISO 6936:1988 Information processing - Conversion between the two coded character sets of ISO 646 and ISO 6937-2 and the CCITT international telegraph alphabet No. 2 (ITA 2)
- ISO/IEC 6937:2001 Information technology - Coded graphic character set for text communication - Latin alphabet
- ISO 6938:2012 Textiles – Natural fibres – Generic names and definitions
- ISO 6946 Building components and building elements – Thermal resistance and thermal transmittance – Calculation method
- ISO 6951:1986 Information processing - Processor system bus interface (Eurobus A)
- ISO 6974-1:2012 Natural gas — Determination of composition and associated uncertainty by gas chromatography Part 1: General guidelines and calculation of composition
- ISO 6974-2:2012 Natural gas — Determination of composition and associated uncertainty by gas chromatography Part 2: Uncertainty calculations
- ISO 6974-3:2001 Natural gas — Determination of composition with defined uncertainty by gas chromatography — Part 3: Determination of hydrogen, helium, oxygen, nitrogen, carbon dioxide and hydrocarbons up to C8 using two packed columns
- ISO 6974-4:2001 Natural gas — Determination of composition with defined uncertainty by gas chromatography — Part 4: Determination of nitrogen, carbon dioxide and C1 to C5 and C6+ hydrocarbons for a laboratory and on-line measuring system using two columns
- ISO 6974-5:2001 Natural gas — Determination of composition with defined uncertainty by gas chromatography — Part 5: Determination of nitrogen, carbon dioxide and C1 to C5 and C6+ hydrocarbons for a laboratory and on-line process application using three columns
- ISO 6974-6: 2008 Natural gas — Determination of composition with defined uncertainty by gas chromatography — Part 6: Determination of hydrogen, helium, oxygen, nitrogen, carbon dioxide and C1 to C8 hydrocarbons using three capillary columns
- ISO 6980 Nuclear energy - Reference beta-particle radiation
  - ISO 6980-1:2006 Part 1: Methods of production
  - ISO 6980-2:2004 Part 2: Calibration fundamentals related to basic quantities characterizing the radiation field
  - ISO 6980-3:2006 Part 3: Calibration of area and personal dosemeters and the determination of their response as a function of beta radiation energy and angle of incidence
- ISO 7000:2014 Graphical symbols for use on equipment - Registered symbols
- ISO 7001:2007 Graphical symbols – Public information symbols
- ISO 7002 Agricultural food products – Layout for a standard method of sampling from a lot
- ISO 7010:2011 Graphical symbols - Safety colours and safety signs - Registered safety signs
- ISO 7029:2017 Acoustics - Statistical distribution of hearing thresholds related to age and gender
- ISO 7056:1981 Plastics laboratory ware – Beakers
- ISO/IEC 7064:2003 Information technology - Security techniques - Check character systems
- ISO 7065 Information processing – Data interchange on 200 mm (8 in) flexible disk cartridges using modified frequency modulation recording at 13 262 ftprad, 1,9 tpmm (48 tpi), on both sides
  - ISO 7065-1:1985 Part 1: Dimensional, physical and magnetic characteristics
  - ISO 7065-2:1985 Part 2: Track format
- ISO 7066 Assessment of uncertainty in the calibration and use of flow measurement devices
  - ISO 7066-2:1988 Part 2: Non-linear calibration relationships
- ISO 7078:1985 Building construction – Procedures for setting out, measurement and surveying – Vocabulary and guidance notes
- ISO 7083:1983 Technical drawings – Symbols for geometrical tolerancing – Proportions and dimensions
- ISO 7087:1984 Ferroalloys - Experimental methods for the evaluation of the quality variation and methods for checking the precision of sampling
- ISO 7088:1981 Fish-meal – Vocabulary
- ISO 7089:2000 Plain washers — Normal series — Product grade A
- ISO 7090:2000 Plain washers, chamfered — Normal series — Product grade A
- ISO 7091:2000 Plain washers — Normal series — Product grade C
- ISO 7092:2000 Plain washers — Small series — Product grade A
- ISO 7093:2000 Plain washers — Large series
- ISO 7098:2015 Information and documentation – Romanization of Chinese
- ISO 7112:2017 Machinery for forestry – Portable brush-cutters and grass-trimmers – Vocabulary
- ISO 7130:2013 Earth-moving machinery – Operator training – Content and methods
- ISO 7131:2009 Earth-moving machinery – Loaders – Terminology and commercial specifications
- ISO 7132:2003 Earth-moving machinery – Dumpers – Terminology and commercial specifications
- ISO 7133:2013 Earth-moving machinery – Scrapers – Terminology and commercial specifications
- ISO 7134:2013 Earth-moving machinery – Graders – Terminology and commercial specifications
- ISO 7135:2009 Earth-moving machinery – Hydraulic excavators – Terminology and commercial specifications
- ISO 7136:2006 Earth-moving machinery – Pipelayers – Terminology and commercial specifications
- ISO 7137:1995 Aircraft - Environmental conditions and test procedures for airborne equipment
- ISO 7144:1986 Documentation – Presentation of theses and similar documents
- ISO 7151:1988 Surgical instruments – Non-cutting, articulated instruments – General requirements and test methods
- ISO 7152:1997 Camping tents and caravan awnings – Vocabulary and list of equivalent terms
- ISO 7153 Surgical instruments – Materials
  - ISO 7153-1:2016 Part 1: Metals
- ISO 7154:1983 Documentation - Bibliographic filing principles
- ISO 7176 Wheelchairs
  - ISO 7176-21:2009 Part 21: Requirements and test methods for electromagnetic compatibility of electrically powered wheelchairs and scooters, and battery chargers
  - ISO 7176-26:2007 Part 26: Vocabulary
- ISO 7185:1990 Information technology - Programming languages - Pascal
- ISO 7194:2008 Measurement of fluid flow in closed conduits – Velocity-area methods of flow measurement in swirling or asymmetric flow conditions in circular ducts by means of current-meters or Pitot static tubes
- ISO 7196:1995 Acoustics – Frequency-weighting characteristic for infrasound measurements
- ISO 7197:2006 Neurosurgical implants – Sterile, single-use hydrocephalus shunts and components
- ISO 7198:2016 Cardiovascular implants and extracorporeal systems – Vascular prostheses – Tubular vascular grafts and vascular patches
- ISO 7199:2016 Cardiovascular implants and artificial organs – Blood-gas exchangers (oxygenators)
- ISO 7200:2004 Technical product documentation – Data fields in title blocks and document headers
- ISO 7206 Implants for surgery – Partial and total hip joint prostheses
  - ISO 7206-1:2008 Part 1: Classification and designation of dimensions
  - ISO 7206-2:2011 Part 2: Articulating surfaces made of metallic, ceramic and plastics materials
  - ISO 7206-4:2010 Part 4: Determination of endurance properties and performance of stemmed femoral components
  - ISO 7206-6:2013 Part 6: Endurance properties testing and performance requirements of neck region of stemmed femoral components
  - ISO 7206-10:2003 Part 10: Determination of resistance to static load of modular femoral heads
  - ISO 7206-12:2016 Part 12: Deformation test method for acetabular shells
  - ISO 7206-13:2016 Part 13: Determination of resistance to torque of head fixation of stemmed femoral components
- ISO 7207 Implants for surgery – Components for partial and total knee joint prostheses
  - ISO 7207-1:2007 Part 1: Classification, definitions and designation of dimensions
  - ISO 7207-2:2011 Part 2: Articulating surfaces made of metal, ceramic and plastics materials
- ISO 7216:2015 Agricultural and forestry tractors – Measurement of noise emitted when in motion
- ISO 7218:2007 Microbiology of food and animal feeding stuffs – General requirements and guidance for microbiological examinations
- ISO 7220:1996 Information and documentation - Presentation of catalogues of standards
- ISO 7237:1993 Caravans – Masses and dimensions – Vocabulary
- ISO 7240 Fire detection and alarm systems
- ISO 7251:2005 Microbiology of food and animal feeding stuffs – Horizontal method for the detection and enumeration of presumptive Escherichia coli – Most probable number technique
- ISO 7255:1985 Shipbuilding – Active control units of ships – Vocabulary
- ISO 7275:1985 Documentation – Presentation of title information of series
- ISO 7287:2002 Graphical symbols for thermal cutting equipment
- ISO 7294:1983 Saw teeth for woodworking saws – Profile shape – Terminology and designation
- ISO 7296 Cranes - Graphic symbols
  - ISO 7296-1:1991 Part 1: General
  - ISO 7296-2:1996 Part 2: Mobile cranes
  - ISO 7296-3:2006 Part 3: Tower cranes
- ISO 7297:1985 Information processing – Magnetic disk for data storage devices – 96 000 flux transitions per track, 200 mm (7.9 in) outer diameter, 63,5 mm (2.5 in) inner diameter
- ISO 7298:1985 Information processing – Magnetic disk for data storage devices – 158 000 flux transitions per track, 210 mm (8.3 in) outer diameter, 100 mm (3.9 in) inner diameter
- ISO 7345:1987 Thermal insulation – Physical quantities and definitions
- ISO 7347:1987 Ferroalloys - Experimental methods for checking the bias of sampling and sample preparation
- ISO 7348:1992 Glass containers – Manufacture – Vocabulary
- ISO/IEC 7350:1991 Information technology - Registration of repertoires of graphic characters from ISO/IEC 10367
- ISO 7369:2004 Pipework - Metal hoses and hose assemblies - Vocabulary
- ISO 7372:2005 Trade data interchange - Trade data elements directory
- ISO 7373:1987 Ferroalloys - Experimental methods for checking the precision of sample division
- ISO 7376:2009 Anaesthetic and respiratory equipment – Laryngoscopes for tracheal intubation
- ISO 7380 Button Head Screws
  - ISO 7380-1:2011 Part 1: Hexagon socket button head screws
  - ISO 7380-2:2011 Part 2: Hexagon socket button head screws with collar
- ISO 7396 Medical gas pipeline systems
  - ISO 7396-1:2016 Part 1: Pipeline systems for compressed medical gases and vacuum
  - ISO 7396-2:2007 Part 2: Anaesthetic gas scavenging disposal systems
- ISO 7404 Methods for the petrographic analysis of coals
  - ISO 7404-1:2016 Part 1: Vocabulary
- ISO 7437:1990 Technical drawings – Construction drawings – General rules for execution of production drawings for prefabricated structural components
- ISO 7462:1985 Shipbuilding - Principal ship dimensions - Terminology and definitions for computer applications
- ISO 7478:1987 Information processing systems – Data communication – Multilink procedures
- ISO 7479:1982 Textile machinery and accessories — Metal reeds with plastic baulk [Withdrawn: replaced with ISO 366-4]
- ISO/IEC 7480:1991 Information technology – Telecommunications and information exchange between systems – Start-stop transmission signal quality at DTE/DCE interfaces
- ISO 7482 Raw goat skins
  - ISO 7482-1:1998 Part 1: Descriptions of defects
- ISO/IEC 7487 Information technology – Data interchange on 130 mm (5,25 in) flexible disk cartridges using modified frequency modulation recording at 7 958 ftprad, 1,9 tpmm (48 tpi), on both sides – ISO type 202
  - ISO/IEC 7487-1:1993 Part 1: Dimensional, physical and magnetic characteristics
  - ISO 7487-2:1985 Part 2: Track format A
  - ISO 7487-3:1986 Part 3: Track format B
- ISO 7489:1986 Dental glass polyalkenoate cements [Withdrawn: replaced with ISO 9917]
- ISO/IEC 7498 Information technology — Open Systems Interconnection — Basic Reference Model
  - ISO/IEC 7498-1:1994 The Basic Model
  - ISO 7498-2:1989 Part 2: Security Architecture
  - ISO/IEC 7498-3:1997 Naming and addressing
  - ISO/IEC 7498-4:1989 Part 4: Management framework
- ISO/IEC 7501 Identification cards – Machine readable travel documents
  - ISO/IEC 7501-1:2008 Part 1: Machine readable passport
  - ISO/IEC 7501-2:1997 Part 2: Machine readable visa
  - ISO/IEC 7501-3:2005 Part 3: Machine readable official travel documents
- ISO 7504:2015 Gas analysis – Vocabulary
- ISO 7518:1983 Technical drawings – Construction drawings – Simplified representation of demolition and rebuilding
- ISO 7519:1991 Technical drawings – Construction drawings – General principles of presentation for general arrangement and assembly drawings
- ISO 7520:1985 Ferronickel - Determination of cobalt content - Flame atomic absorption spectrometric method
- ISO 7524:1985 Nickel, ferronickel and nickel alloys - Determination of carbon content - Infra-red absorption method after induction furnace combustion
- ISO 7526:1985 Nickel, ferronickel and nickel alloys - Determination of sulfur content - Infra-red absorption method after induction furnace combustion
- ISO 7527:1985 Nickel, ferronickel and nickel alloys - Determination of sulfur content - Iodimetric titration method after induction furnace combustion
- ISO 7550:1985 Laboratory glassware – Disposable micropipettes
- ISO 7563:1998 Fresh fruits and vegetables – Vocabulary
- ISO 7568:1986 Woodworking machines – Thickness planing machines with rotary cutterblock for one-side dressing – Nomenclature and acceptance conditions
- ISO 7569:1986 Woodworking machines – Planing machines for two-, three- or four-side dressing – Nomenclature and acceptance conditions
- ISO 7570:1986 Woodworking machines – Surface planing and thicknessing machines – Nomenclature and acceptance conditions
- ISO 7571:1986 Woodworking machines – Surface planing machines with cutterblock for one-side dressing – Nomenclature and acceptance conditions
- ISO 7573:2008 Technical product documentation – Parts lists
- ISO 7574 Acoustics – Statistical methods for determining and verifying stated noise emission values of machinery and equipment
  - ISO 7574-1:1985 Part 1: General considerations and definitions
  - ISO 7574-2:1985 Part 2: Methods for stated values for individual machines
  - ISO 7574-3:1985 Part 3: Simple (transition) method for stated values for batches of machines
  - ISO 7574-4:1985 Part 4: Methods for stated values for batches of machines
- ISO 7583:2013 Anodizing of aluminium and its alloys - Terms and definitions
- ISO 7626 Mechanical vibration and shock – Experimental determination of mechanical mobility
  - ISO 7626-1:2011 Part 1: Basic terms and definitions, and transducer specifications
  - ISO 7626-2:2015 Part 2: Measurements using single-point translation excitation with an attached vibration exciter
  - ISO 7626-5:1994 Part 5: Measurements using impact excitation with an exciter which is not attached to the structure
- ISO 7637 Road vehicles – Electrical disturbances from conduction and coupling
  - ISO 7637-1:2015 Part 1: Definitions and general considerations
- ISO 7639:1985 Road vehicles - Diagnostic systems - Graphical symbols
- ISO 7665:1983 Information processing – File structure and labelling of flexible disk cartridges for information interchange
- ISO 7692:1983 Ferrotitanium - Determination of titanium content - Titrimetric method
- ISO 7693:1984 Ferrotungsten - Determination of tungsten content - Cinchonine gravimetric method
- ISO 7704:1985 Water quality – Evaluation of membrane filters used for microbiological analyses
- ISO 7711 Dentistry – Diamond rotary instruments
  - ISO 7711-3:2004 Part 3: Grit sizes, designation and colour code
- ISO 7712:1983 Laboratory glassware – Disposable Pasteur pipettes
- ISO 7736 Road vehicles – Car radio for front installation – Installation space including connections
- ISO 7740:1985 Instruments for surgery – Scalpels with detachable blades – Fitting dimensions
- ISO 7741:1986 Instruments for surgery – Scissors and shears – General requirements and test methods
- ISO/IEC 7776:1995 Information technology – Telecommunications and information exchange between systems – High-level data link control procedures – Description of the X.25 LAPB-compatible DTE data link procedures
- ISO 7779:2010 Acoustics - Measurement of airborne noise emitted by information technology and telecommunications equipment
- ISO/IEC 7810 Identification cards – Physical characteristics
- ISO/IEC 7811 Identification cards – Recording technique
- ISO/IEC 7812 Identification cards – Identification of issuers
- ISO/IEC 7813:2006 Information technology – Identification cards – Financial transaction cards
- ISO/IEC 7816 Identification cards – Integrated circuit cards
- ISO 7830:1983 Photography — Safety photographic films other than motion picture films — Material specifications Withdrawn: replaced with ISO 543, later ISO 18906
- ISO 7839:2005 Textile machinery and accessories – Knitting machines – Vocabulary and classification
- ISO/TS 7849 Acoustics – Determination of airborne sound power levels emitted by machinery using vibration measurement
  - ISO/TS 7849-1:2009 Part 1: Survey method using a fixed radiation factor
  - ISO/TS 7849-2:2009 Part 2: Engineering method including determination of the adequate radiation factor
- ISO 7863:1984 Height setting micrometers and riser blocks
- ISO 7864:2016 Sterile hypodermic needles for single use – Requirements and test methods
- ISO 7870 Control charts
  - ISO 7870-1:2014 Part 1: General guidelines
  - ISO 7870-2:2013 Part 2: Shewhart control charts
  - ISO 7870-3:2012 Part 3: Acceptance control charts
  - ISO 7870-4:2011 Part 4: Cumulative sum charts
  - ISO 7870-5:2014 Part 5: Specialized control charts
  - ISO 7870-6:2016 Part 6: EWMA control charts
  - ISO 7870-8:2017 Part 8: Charting techniques for short runs and small mixed batches
- ISO 7876 Fuel injection equipment – Vocabulary
  - ISO 7876-1:1990 Part 1: Fuel injection pumps
  - ISO 7876-2:1991 Part 2: Fuel injectors
  - ISO 7876-3:1993 Part 3: Unit injectors
  - ISO 7876-4:2004 Part 4: High-pressure pipes and end-connections
  - ISO 7876-5:2004 Part 5: Common rail fuel injection system
- ISO 7885:2010 Dentistry – Sterile injection needles for single use
- ISO 7886 Sterile hypodermic syringes for single use
  - ISO 7886-1:2017 Part 1: Syringes for manual use
  - ISO 7886-2:1996 Part 2: Syringes for use with power-driven syringe pumps
  - ISO 7886-3:2005 Part 3: Auto-disable syringes for fixed-dose immunization
  - ISO 7886-4:2006 Part 4: Syringes with re-use prevention feature
- ISO 7889:2003 Yogurt – Enumeration of characteristic microorganisms – Colony-count technique at 37 degrees C
- ISO 7899 Water quality – Detection and enumeration of intestinal enterococci
  - ISO 7899-1:1998 Part 1: Miniaturized method (Most Probable Number) for surface and waste water
  - ISO 7899-2:2000 Part 2: Membrane filtration method
- ISO 7919 Mechanical vibration – Evaluation of machine vibration by measurements on rotating shafts
  - ISO 7919-3:2009 Part 3: Coupled industrial machines
  - ISO 7919-4:2009 Part 4: Gas turbine sets with fluid-film bearings
  - ISO 7919-5:2005 Part 5: Machine sets in hydraulic power generating and pumping plants
- ISO 7929:1985 Information processing – Magnetic disk for data storage devices – 83 000 flux transitions per track, 130 mm (5.12 in) outer diameter, 40 mm (1.57 in) inner diameter
- ISO 7932:2004 Microbiology of food and animal feeding stuffs – Horizontal method for the enumeration of presumptive Bacillus cereus – Colony-count technique at 30 degrees C
- ISO 7937:2004 Microbiology of food and animal feeding stuffs – Horizontal method for the enumeration of Clostridium perfringens – Colony-count technique
- ISO/IEC 7942 Information technology – Computer graphics and image processing – Graphical Kernel System (GKS)
- ISO 7944:1998 Optics and optical instruments - Reference wavelengths
- ISO 7945:1985 Woodworking machines – Single spindle boring machines – Nomenclature and acceptance conditions
- ISO 7946:1985 Woodworking machines – Slot mortising machines – Nomenclature and acceptance conditions
- ISO 7947:1985 Woodworking machines – Two-, three- and four-side moulding machines – Nomenclature and acceptance conditions
- ISO 7948:1987 Woodworking machines – Routing machines – Nomenclature and acceptance conditions
- ISO 7949:1985 Woodworking machines – Veneer pack edge shears – Nomenclature and acceptance conditions
- ISO 7950:1985 Woodworking machines – Single chain mortising machines – Nomenclature and acceptance conditions
- ISO 7957:1987 Woodworking machines – Radial circular saws – Nomenclature and acceptance conditions
- ISO 7958:1987 Woodworking machines – Single blade stroke circular sawing machines for lengthwise cutting of solid woods and panels – Nomenclature and acceptance conditions
- ISO 7959:1987 Woodworking machines – Double edging precision circular sawing machines – Nomenclature and acceptance conditions
- ISO 7960:1995 Airborne noise emitted by machine tools – Operating conditions for woodworking machines
- ISO 7967 Reciprocating internal combustion engines - Vocabulary of components and systems
  - ISO 7967-1:2005 Part 1: Structure and external covers
  - ISO 7967-2:2010 Part 2: Main running gear
  - ISO 7967-3:2010 Part 3: Valves, camshaft drives and actuating mechanisms
  - ISO 7967-4:2005 Part 4: Pressure charging and air/exhaust gas ducting systems
  - ISO 7967-5:2010 Part 5: Cooling systems
  - ISO 7967-6:2005 Part 6: Lubricating systems
  - ISO 7967-7:2005 Part 7: Governing systems
  - ISO 7967-8:2005 Part 8: Starting systems
  - ISO 7967-9:2010 Part 9: Control and monitoring systems
  - ISO 7967-10:2014 Part 10: Ignition systems
  - ISO 7967-11:2014 Part 11: Fuel systems
  - ISO 7967-12:2014 Part 12: Exhaust emission control systems
- ISO 7983:1988 Woodworking machines – Single blade circular sawing machines with travelling table – Nomenclature and acceptance conditions
- ISO 7987:1985 Woodworking machines – Turning lathes – Nomenclature and acceptance conditions
- ISO 7988:1988 Woodworking machines – Double-end tenoning machines – Nomenclature and acceptance conditions
- ISO 7998:2005 Ophthalmic optics - Spectacle frames - Lists of equivalent terms and vocabulary
