= DRDC Toronto =

Major military research station in Canada

Coordinates: 43°45′02″N 079°28′07″W

DRDC Toronto is a major military research station located at the former site of CFB Downsview in Toronto Ontario, Canada. It is one of several centres making up Defence Research and Development Canada (DRDC).

== History ==
The centre's roots go back to 1939 when the Department of National Defence (DND) recognized the vital importance of human factors in the ability of Canada's armed forces to safeguard the nation in peacetime and at war. Recognizing the importance of aviation medicine to defence, an inter-departmental committee, the Associate Committee on Aviation Medical Research, was established in June 1939, chaired by Sir Frederick Banting. Laboratory studies in pressure physiology began in the Banting and Best Institute (now the Faculty of Medicine at the University of Toronto, where the first decompression chamber for human studies in Canada was set up.

To expand the effort, in 1940, the No.1 Clinical Investigation Unit (No1 CIU) was formed at the former Eglinton Hunt Club at 1107 Avenue Road with the construction of a low-temperature low-pressure chamber to support research on human capabilities under extremes of cold and high altitude. This led to extensive activity in the development of oxygen and survival equipment for the Royal Canadian Air Force.

The second significant experimental facility constructed was the first human centrifuge in the allied countries, pioneered by Dr. Wilbur R. Franks and his colleagues. This was brought into operation in late 1941, and by August 1945 more than 13, 000 human runs had been carried out without a mishap. The human centrifuge was used to pioneer and create the world's first anti "G" flying suit to go into service, when it was worn during Operation Torch during the battle for Oran with the Royal Navy's Fleet Air Arm in November 1942.

In the post-war period, research in aviation medicine continued in the universities and at Avenue Road, now renamed the RCAF Institute of Aviation Medicine (RCAF/IAF). It was assigned responsibilities for aviation medical training, medical statistics, aircrew medical selection, life support and survival equipment and clinical aviation medicine. Under unification in 1968, it was renamed the Canadian Forces Institute of Environment Medicine (CFIEM).

In 1947, the Defence Research Board (DRB) was established with its primary responsibility in the field of military medicine and the study of occupational problems of the armed services. Basically, DRB was directed to the study of the environmental factors and hazards affecting them, and the assessment of their task with the view of improving their performance in it.

To address the new DRB role in military human factors research, the Defence Research Medical Laboratory (DRML) was constructed at Downsview, Ontario in 1952, with the official opening on February 12, 1954. Its program was widened to embrace studies of tri-service applicability and included food and clothing research. This laboratory was renamed the Defence Research Establishment Toronto (DRET) in 1968.

In an effort to consolidate the research effort in the military, DRET and CFIEM were amalgamated in April 1971 and a new organization was formed, the Defence and Civil Institute of Environmental Medicine (DCIEM), had a combined military and civilian research staff, which provided a unique combination of operational and scientific expertise that addressed the operational needs of the Canadian Armed Forces in all environments. The core mission was the performance of the human element in military systems. Over the years many new unique facilities were developed at DCIEM, including a new human centrifuge, hot and cold environmental chambers, hypobaric (1954) and hyperbaric (1977) chambers, and impact studies facility (1978).

The unification of the three services into the Canadian Armed Forces (CAF) in 1968 saw DRB evolve, becoming the Research and Development Branch of the CAF by 1974. The laboratories of the DRB were integrated to DND through the formation of the Defence Research and Development (R&D) Branch (DRDB) to forge closer relationships between scientists and the military. The new branch was led by the Chief of Research and Development (CRAD), within the Assistant Deputy Minister (Materiel) group.

The Hunt Club location closed in 1994 and its operations moved to Downsview. The R&D Branch was reorganized on April 1, 2000, when it became Defence Research and Development Canada (DRDC), part of DND. As Canada's leader in defence and national security science and technology (S&T), DRDC maintains a broad scientific program and actively collaborates with industry, international allies, academia, other government departments and the national security community. DRDC Toronto and its forebears have made major contributions to knowledge and equipment which has not only aided the Canadian Armed Forces in the completion of their missions, but has had a significant impact in the civilian sector both in Canada and worldwide.

== Functions of DRDC Toronto ==
DRDC Toronto is a research and development organisation for integrated human effectiveness, science and technology (S&T) in defence and national security. It provides the Canadian Armed Forces (CAF), government agencies, academia, and industrial clients with an internationally recognized combination of expertise and research facilities.

DRDC Toronto uses a systems-based approach to cover all aspects of human performance and effectiveness, including individual and team performance, human-technology interaction, and the social and psychological factors that affect the resolution of conflict.

Their scientists and technologists apply, exploit and share the results of research in the following fields:

- Human systems integration
- Human performance in stressful environments
- Military medicine
- Simulation and modelling of the human in complex military systems
- Human issues in command and control
- Team performance and collaborative behaviour
- Psychology of malicious intent
- Social and cultural factors influencing behaviour

== Current research initiatives ==
- Behaviourally Realistic Approaches to Security Risk Management: Researchers developed models of risk perception, assessment, and communication in response to realistic asymmetric threat scenarios, such as chemical, biological, radiological, or nuclear terrorist attacks.
- Distributed Team Modelling: Using a software platform based on a problem solving task requiring information sharing, scientists compared the effectiveness of different team structures using measures of collaboration, information sharing, and trust.
- Tools for the Automatic Extraction and Visualization of Concepts: Tools are being developed to improve the analysis of massive quantities of information and intelligence from various sources to support military decision-making.
- Rapid Diagnostic Tools for Detecting Mild Traumatic Brain Injuries: In collaboration with Canadian research hospitals and international partners, diagnostic tools are being developed to assist in the identification of mild traumatic brain injuries.

The Human Effectiveness Experimentation Centre manages DRDC Toronto's major research facilities. These facilities, which are used to simulate a broad range of operational environments, include:

- Synthetic Environment Research Facility
- Group Immersive Simulator and Dismounted Soldier Simulator
- Human Centrifuge
- Diving Research Facility
- Climatic Facility
- Hypobaric Altitude Chamber
- Noise Simulation Facility

== Joint Operational Human Sciences Centre (JOHSC) ==
JOHSC provides integrated human science and technical solutions in support of the CAF across current and future operational environments through research, development and evaluation. JOHSC members are part of the co-located Canadian Forces Environmental Medicine Establishment (CFEME).

JOHSC can provide valuable and timely advice to a range of aerospace, land and sea/undersea challenges.

JOHSC can also utilize the unique facilities and scientific expertise of DRDC Toronto and other DRDC centres to provide S&T solutions to the CAF.

== Significant accomplishments ==
- Decompression tables (DCIEM Sport Diving Tables) that are now used worldwide and have been adopted by foreign navies, commercial diving companies and civilian organizations to reduce the risk of decompression illness, once commonly called "the bends."
- Canadian Underwater Mine-Countermeasures Apparatus (CUMA) is a new diver mine-countermeasures (MCM) diving set with a depth capability of 80 metres (260 ft), as well as being anti-acoustic and anti-magnetic.
- The STInG (Sustained Tolerance to INcreased G) system, which provides G protection for pilots, superior to any current operational system.
- Virtual reality simulator for Helicopter Deck Landing to simulate the dangerous task of landing a helicopter on the moving deck of a ship.
- Clothe the Soldier project provided human engineering support to the Canadian Army's acquisition of over 24 new items of state-of-the-art soldier protective clothing and personal equipment
- Load Carriage Robot - an instrumented articulated manikin that mimics the movement of the human torso
- A Cold Exposure Survival Model (CESM) used in search and rescue (SAR) Operations
- A new Wind Chill Equivalent Temperature Chart for North America
- A Heat Stress Calculator for firefighters used throughout Ontario.
- The Pilot Anthropometric Scanning System (PASS) - a method of digitally scanning the physical dimensions of potential aircrew candidates. The cockpits of all CAF aircraft fleets were assessed to accurately determine the body dimensions required to safely operate in these environments. A computer program then analyzes these sets of data to determine which aircraft fleets an aircrew candidate would be physically eligible to fly.

== See also ==
- Canadian government scientific research organizations
