= Ffilharmonious Jug Band =

The Ffilharmonious Jug Band was an Anglo-American jug band group in England in the late 1960s. Members were American Jeff Wilson (Guitar, Slide whistle, Washtub bass, Jug, Kazoo, Mandolin, and vocals), American Jim Johnson (Banjo, Guitar, Dobro, percussion, Kazoo, Hand trumpet, Harp, Phonofiddle, Jug, Washtub bass, and vocals), Briton Doug Kyle (Guitar, Harp, Kazoo, Jug, Banjo, and vocals), and Canadian, Pete Ballan (Washboard, spoons, Kazoo, Souzazoo, Door bell, Bicycle bell, cymbals, Sanding blocks, and vocals).

The band first played at the old Coach and Horses public house on the A-40 in East Wycombe (High Wycombe area), England, in 1966. The Coach and Horses hosted a folk club evening each week and that is where the two Americans met Kyle and Ballan. Kyle and Johnson had been playing jug band music separately for a few years so it was an instant match. They organized the group almost immediately. Wilson was a fairly accomplished musician who had been playing popular music for some years and had been playing American folk music of the 1960s with Johnson in the duo "Jim & Jeff". Pete Ballan had been a British Merchant seaman and was a regular at the folk club where he enjoyed the English traditional songs - especially sea shanties.

After considering several options the name Ffilharmonious Jug Band was chosen. The group played at folk clubs, universities, public houses, and concert venues over much of southeast England and recorded an LP titled The Ffilharmonious Jug Band at Pinner Studios, London area in 1967.

== Discography ==
The Ffilharmonious Jug Band track listing:

- * "Mobile Line"
- * "Stealin', Stealin'"
- * "Alberta"
- * "Sadie Green"
- * "Back in Black"
- * "The Blues My Naughty Sweetie Gives to Me"
- * "Rag Mama"
- * "Jug Band Music (The Doctor Sez Give 'em)"
- * "Why Don't Women Like Me"
- * "Crazy Words, Crazy Tune"
- * "Houston"
