= Human factors integration =

Integration of human factors and ergonomics into the systems engineering process

Human Factors Integration (HFI) is the process adopted by a number of key industries (notably defence and hazardous industries like oil & gas) in Europe to integrate human factors and ergonomics into the systems engineering process. Although each industry has different goals, processes, and set of domains (see below the seven MANPRINT-defined domains), the underlying approach is the same.

== Overview ==
In essence, HFI tries to reconcile the top down nature of system engineering with the iterative nature of a user centred design approach (e.g. ISO 6385 or ISO 9241-210 (Note: ISO 9241-210:2010 (Ergonomics of human-system interaction -- Part 210: Human-centred design for interactive systems) superseded ISO 13407:1999 (Human-centred design processes for interactive systems), which has been withdrawn.)). It often does this by creating a Human Factors Integration Plan (HFIP) that sits alongside the system development plan. The purpose of the HFIP is to define how the Human Factors Engineering activities necessary for the successful delivery of a particular system will be conducted.

It establishes the guiding principles to be followed by the project to implement the best-practice Human Factors methods. As well as the principles involved, the Plan normally describes the organisation, processes and controls necessary over the entire life cycle of the system from the concept phase through to decommissioning.

== Domains ==
HFI undertakes this by conducting a formal process that identifies and reconciles human related issues. These issues are split for convenience into domains. The seven domains defined by the US Army under its MANPRINT programme are:

Manpower - The number of military and civilian personnel required and potentially available to operate, maintain, sustain and provide training for systems

Personnel - The cognitive and physical capabilities required to be able to train for, operate, maintain and sustain systems.

Training - The instruction or education, and on-the-job or unit training required to provide personnel their essential job skills, knowledge, values and attributes.

Human Factors Engineering - The integration of human characteristics into system definition, design, development, and evaluation to optimise human-machine performance under operational conditions.

Health Hazard Assessment - Short or long term hazards to health occurring as a result of normal operation of the system.

System safety - Safety risks occurring when the system is functioning in an abnormal manner.

Soldier Survivability - The characteristics of a system that can reduce fratricide, detectability and probability of being attacked and minimize system damage, soldier injury and cognitive and physical fatigue.

The UK Ministry of Defence (MoD) adopted a similar HFI approach to MANPRINT in the early 1990s, but excluded Soldier Survivability. Subsequently the MoD added a seventh 'Social & Organisational' domain. Some industries also include habitability as a separate domain.

== HFI Plan ==
The HFI plan scope defines the relationship between all the activities and the Human Factors domains and provides a systematic approach to ensure that:

- The human role in the system is defined to optimise human performance in relation to the core system architecture and ancillary equipment.
- Adequate human-equipment analyses and trade-off studies are performed, revisiting the assumptions throughout the system life cycle. The process is iterative. As the programme progresses, the HF activities involve greater depth of analysis.
- Biomedical analysis and design support includes the environmental protection necessary to promote health and safety, and the capability for safe operation and maintenance of the core architecture and ancillary equipment.
- Training characteristics (materials, environment, evaluation criteria, etc.) for system personnel are identified.
- System testing and evaluation is conducted to verify that users can safely and effectively operate, maintain and support equipment in its intended environment.
- The design meets agreed operational performance standards and where this is not the case, to modify the design or associated training in such a way that the resultant crewed system meets the required standards.

== See also ==
- Ergonomics – Designing systems to suit their users
