= Human systems integration =

Human systems integration (HSI) is an interdisciplinary managerial and technical approach to developing and sustaining systems which focuses on the interfaces between humans and modern technical systems. The objective of HSI is to provide equal weight to human, hardware, and software elements of system design throughout systems engineering and lifecycle logistics management activities across the lifecycle of a system. The end goal of HSI is to optimize total system performance and minimize total ownership costs. The field of HSI integrates work from multiple human-centered domains of study, including training, manpower (the number of people), personnel (the qualifications of people), human factors engineering, safety, occupational health, survivability, and habitability.

HSI is a total systems approach that focuses on the comprehensive integration across the HSI domains, and across systems engineering and logistics support processes. The domains of HSI are interrelated: a focus on integration allows tradeoffs between domains, resulting in improved manpower utilization, reduced training costs, reduced maintenance time, improved user acceptance, decreased overall lifecycle costs, and a decreased need for redesigns and retrofits. An example of a tradeoff is the increased training costs that might result from reducing manpower or increasing the necessary skills for a specific maintenance task. HSI is most effective when it is initiated early in the acquisition process, when the need for a new or modified capability is identified. Application of HSI should continue throughout the lifecycle of the system, integrating HSI processes alongside the evolution of the system.

HSI is an important part of systems engineering projects.

== History ==
=== Military origins ===
The US Navy initiated the Military Manpower versus Hardware (HARDMAN) Methodology in 1977 to address problems with manpower, personnel and training in the service. In 1980, The National Academies of Sciences, Engineering, and Medicine established the Committee on Human Factors, which was later renamed the Committee on Human Systems Integration. The modern concept of human systems integration in the United States originated in 1986 as a US Army program called the Manpower and Personnel Integration (MANPRINT) program. With ties to the academic fields of industrial engineering and experimental psychology, MANPRINT incorporated human factors engineering with manpower, personnel and training domains into an integrated discipline. MANPRINT focused on the needs and capabilities of the soldier during the development of military systems, and MANPRINT framed a human-centered focus in six domains: human factors engineering, manpower, personnel, training, health hazards and system safety. The US Marine Corps, a component of the Navy, implemented aspects of both HARDMAN and MANPRINT programs to achieve HSI objectives, issuing a formal HSI policy in Marine Corps Order 5000.22 in 1994. The US Air Force began an HSI program in 1982 as "IMPACTS". Modern HSI programs abandoned early acronyms such as HARDMAN, MANPRINT and IMPACTS over the course of the development of their HSI programs. For example, the Air Force currently manages HSI through the Air Force Office of Human Systems Integration (AFHSIO). The US Coast Guard implemented an HSI program in 2000 in the strategy and HR capability division (CG-1B) of the human resources directorate. The US Department of Homeland Security initiated an HSI program under the Science and Technology Directorate in 2007, and the Transportation Security Administration (TSA) initiated a focused HSI effort under the umbrella of DHS S&T in 2018. The Federal Rail Administration (under the National Transportation Safety Board) and NASA Ames Research Center also address HSI. The United Kingdom, Canada, Australia and New Zealand have HSI programs similarly rooted in human factors and modeled after the Army MANPRINT program. In Europe HSI is known as Human Factors Integration.

=== Policy ===
DoD acquisition policy to formalize manpower, personnel, training and safety processes started in 1988. HSI as a distinct focus area was first addressed in the Operation of the Defense Acquisition System (DODINST 5000.02) issued in 2003. Updated in 2008, this policy expanded the six domains in the MANPRINT program to seven, re-focusing systems safety as safety and occupational health, and adding habitability and survivability to the list. In 2010, the National Academy of Sciences committee on Human Systems Integration was transitioned to a board under the Division of Behavioral and Social Sciences and Education. The Board on Human Systems Integration (BOHSI) issues consensus studies, reports and proceedings on HSI research and application. A 2013 update of the DODINST 5000.02 added force protection to the survivability domain. In 2020, the DODINST 5000.02 title and content shifted to the "Operation of the Adaptive Acquisition framework", which describes HSI activities tailored to each acquisition pathway, according to the unique characteristics of the capability being required.

The Defense Acquisition Guidebook, first published in 2002, devotes an entire chapter to manpower planning and HSI. In addition to focused discussion on each domain, the DAG emphasizes viewing HSI from a total system perspective, viewing the human components of a system as integral to the total system as any other component or subsystem. The DAG emphasizes the importance of representing HSI in all aspects of programmatic Integrated Product and Process Development, strategic planning and risk management.

The Standard Practice for Human Systems Integration (SAE 6906) was issued in 2019, and defines standard practices for procurement activities related to HSI. The standard is provided for industry to apply HSI during system design, through disposal and all related activities. This standard includes an overview of HSI and the domains, the domain relationships and tradeoffs, systems development process requirements, and a number of technical standard references

=== Technical standards and requirements ===
ASTM F1337-10 Standard Practice for Human Systems Integration Program Requirements for Ships and Marine Systems, Equipment and Facilities

DI-HFAC 81743 Human Systems Integration Program Plan

== HSI and systems engineering ==
The INCOSE Systems Engineering Handbook provides an authoritative reference to understand the discipline of Systems Engineering for student and practicing professionals. The human part of the system is associated with systems engineering activities from start to finish: from requirements development, to architectural design processes, verification, validation and operation. HSI is integral to the systems engineering process, and must be addressed in all program level integrated development product teams at program, technical, design, and decision reviews throughout the lifecycle of the system. The guidebook focuses on the integration of HSI into SE processes, and notes that intuitive understanding of the important role of the human as an element of a system is not enough to achieve HSI related cost and performance objectives. HSI assists engineers though the addition of human-centered domain specialists and integrators who ensure that human considerations such as usability, safety and health, maintainability and trainability are accounted for using systematic methodologies grounded in each human-centered domain

HSI trade studies and analyses are key methods of HSI that often result in insights not otherwise realized in systems engineering:. The INCOSE Systems Engineering Guidebook recommends a number of steps to effectively incorporate HSI into systems engineering processes

- Initiate HSI early and effectively
- Identify HSI issues and plan analyses
- Document HSI requirements
- Make HSI a factor in source selection for contracted development
- Execute Integrated Technical Processes (including HSI domain integration
- Conduct Proactive Tradeoffs
- Conduct HSI Assessments

HSI interacts with a number of SE activities:

- HSI domain experts collaborate with each other to achieve HSI objectives
- The contractor and the customer may each have an HSI lead integrator and domain experts, each role collaborating with their counterparts
- HSI domain experts may participate in program management roles such as Integrated Product Teams, design teams, logistics management teams, and other systems engineering and program management collaborations
- HSI interacts with reliability, availability and maintainability activities.
- HSI is important to successful test and evaluation and should be integrated to all stages of test and evaluation activities
- HSI interacts with logistics and supportability activities.

== HSI and logistics support ==
Planning and management for cost and performance across the lifecycle of a system are accomplished through lifecycle logistics and integrated product support. These activities ensure that the system will meet sustainment objectives and satisfy user sustainment objectives. Product Support management covers three focus areas: lifecycle management, technical management and infrastructure management. The HSI domains of training, manpower and personnel fall under infrastructure management and are among the twelve elements of logistics / product support. Design Interface, one of the twelve elements of logistics / product support, is a subcategory of technical management and includes multiple domains of HSI, including human factors, personnel, habitability, training, safety and occupational health.

Design Interface (including HSI) is the integration of quantitative systems design characteristics with functional integrated product support elements. In this element of logistics, the systems design parameters drive product support resource requirements. Product support requirements are derived to ensure the system meets availability goals, balancing design and support costs. Design interface is a leading activity that impacts all other logistics / product support elements. Reliability and maintainability are aspects of design interface that have ties to manpower, personnel and training. Maintainability is a measure of the ease and speed in which a piece of equipment or system can be restored to full functionality after a failure; it is a function of design, personnel availability and skill levels, maintenance procedures, training and test equipment. Low maintainability may increase manpower, personnel and training costs over the lifecycle of the system. Human factors engineering and usability play an important role in requirements development, definition, design development and evaluation of system support for reliability and maintainability in the operational environment. Safety and occupational health are important aspects of product support: injury, accidental equipment damage, chronic injuries and long-term health problems reduce supportability, reliability and availability

== Domains ==
=== Human factors engineering ===
Human Factors Engineering (HFE) is an engineering discipline that ensures human capabilities and limitations in areas such as perception, cognition, sensory and physical attributes are incorporated into requirements and design. Effective HFE ensures that systems design capitalizes on, and does not exceed, the abilities of the human user population. HFE can reduce the scope of manpower and training requirements, and ensure the system can be operated maintained and supported by users, in a habitable, safe and survivable manner. HFE is concerned with designing human-systems interfaces such as:

- Functional interfaces: functions, tasks, and allocation of functions to human or automation
- Informational interfaces: information and characteristics of information that support understanding and awareness of the environment and system
- Environmental interfaces: natural and artificial environments, environmental controls, and facility design
- Cooperational interfaces: provisions for team performance, cooperation and collaboration
- Organizational interfaces: job design, management structure, policies and regulations that impact behavior
- Cognitive interfaces: decision rules, decision support systems, provisioning for situational awareness and mental models.
- Physical interfaces: hardware and software elements such as controls, displays, workstations, worksites, accesses, labels and markings, structures, steps and ladders, handholds, maintenance provisions, and more.

Technical standards and requirements:

- ASTM F1166-07 Standard Practice for Human Engineering Design for Marine Systems, Equipment and Facilities
- HFES-200 Human Factors Engineering of Software User Interfaces
- MIL-STD 46855 Human Engineering Requirements for Military Systems, Equipment and Facilities
- MIL-STD 1472 DoD Design Criteria Standard for Human Engineering
- FAA Human Factors Design Standards (HFDS) HF-STD-001B

HFE Data Information Descriptions:

- Human Engineering Program Plan (HEPP) DI-HFAC- 81742
- Human Engineering Systems Analysis Report (HESAR) DI-HFAC-80745
- Human Engineering Design Approach Document (HEDAD-M) DI-HFAC-80747
- Human Engineering Design Approach Document (HEDAD-O) DI-HFAC-80746
- Human Engineering Test Plan (HETP) DI-HFAC-80743
- Human Engineering Test Reports (HETR) DI-HFAC-80744

=== Manpower ===
Manpower focuses on evaluating and defining the right mix of personnel (sometimes referred to as "spaces") for people to operate, maintain and support a system. Manpower requirements should be based on task analysis and consider workload, fatigue, physical and sensory overload, environmental conditions (heat/cold) and reduced visibility. Manpower requirements are the highest cost driver for a system, and can account for up to 70% of the total lifecycle cost. Requirements are based on the full range of operations from a low operational tempo, peacetime scenario to continuous sustained operations, and should include consideration for surge operations capacity. In the manpower analysis process, labor-intensive "high driver tasks" should be examined, and targeted for engineering design changes to reduce the manpower requirement through automation, or improved usability in design. A top down functional analysis can be the basis for determinations of which functions can be eliminated, consolidated, or simplified to control manpower costs.

DoD manpower policy comes from DoD Directive 1100.4, Guidance for Manpower Management

=== Personnel ===
The personnel domain is concerned with the human performance characteristics of the user population (cognitive, sensory and physical skills, knowledge, experience and abilities) of operators, maintainers and support staff required for a system. Cost effective engineering designs minimize personnel requirements, and keep them consistent with the user population. Systems that require new or advance personnel requirements will experience cost increases in other domains, such as training. The user group identified for a system may be referred to as the "target audience". The target audience is situated within a larger organizational structure, and recruitment, retention and personnel policies that may impact or be impacted by the new system should be considered. HSI and the personnel domain may impact policy, or policy may impact HSI. For example, the system may require additional recruitment to sustain the organizational workforce while employing the new system. An example of policy impacting HSI is increased diversity in the user population that may alter anthropometric requirements for the system and impact requirements in the HFE domain.

Manpower and personnel standards include:

Standard Practice for Manpower and Personnel SAE1010

=== Training ===
The training domain is concerned with giving the target audience the opportunity to acquire, gain or enhance the knowledge, skills and abilities needed to operate, maintain and support a system. The target audience may be individuals or groups; training in a systems engineering / acquisition setting is focused on job-relevant knowledge, skills and abilities aimed at satisfying performance levels specific to the system being designed. Training the operators, maintainers and support personnel to conduct their respective tasks is a component of the total system and a part of delivering the intended capability of the system. This includes the integration of training concepts and strategies with elements of logistics support, including technical manuals and procedures, interactive electronic technical manuals, job performance aids, computer based interactive courseware, simulators, and actual equipment, including embedded training capabilities on actual equipment. Training is an important aspect of configuration management: it is critical that training impacts of any and all changes to the system are evaluated. The objective of training is to develop and sustain ready, well trained personnel while reducing lifecycle costs, contributing to a positive readiness outcome. The industry standard practice to develop cost effective training is instructional systems design.

Training standards include:

USA:

Guidance for the Acquisition of Training Data Products and Services (Part 1 of 5) MIL-HDBK 29612/1

Instructional Systems Development/Systems Approach to Training and Education (Part 2 of 5) MIL-HDBK 29612/2

UK

JSP 882 Defence Direction and Guidance for Training and Education

=== Environment, safety and occupational health ===
The environment, safety and occupational health domain is focused on determining system design characteristics that minimize risks to human health and physical wellbeing such as acute or chronic illness, disability death, or injury. In a physical system design, systems safety works closely with systems engineers to identify, document, design out, or mitigate system hazards and reduce residual risk from those hazards. The three areas that must be considered are:

- environment, or the natural and man-made conditions in and around the system and the operational context of the system
- safety factors in systems design that minimize the potential for mishaps, such as walking surfaces, work at heights, pressure extremes, confined spaces, control of hazardous energy releases, fire and explosions
- occupational health: system design features that minimize the risk of injury, acute or chronic illness, or disability or reduce long term job performance from hazards such as noise, chemicals, atmospheric hazards (such as confined spaces), vibration, radiation and repetitive motion injuries.

A health hazard analysis should be performed periodically during the system lifecycle to identify risks, initiating the risk management process. In DoD programs, program managers must prepare a Programmatic Environmental, Safety and Occupational Health Evaluation (PESHE) which is an overall evaluation of ESOH risks for the program, and documents the progress of HHA program monitoring.

Systems safety is grounded in a risk management process but Safety risk management has a unique set of processes and procedures. For example, identified hazards should be designed out of the system whenever possible, either through selecting a different design, or altering the design to eliminate the hazard. If a design change isn't feasible, engineered features or devices should be added to interrupt the hazard and prevent a mishap. Warnings (devices, signs or signals) are the next best mitigation, but are considered to be far less beneficial to preventing mishaps. The last resort is personal protective equipment to protect people from the hazard, and training (knowledge skills and abilities to protect against the hazard and prevent a mishap). HFE review and involvement with design interventions introduced to address hazards is an important connection between the systems safety and HFE domain specialists. Design interventions may have manpower and personnel implications, and training mitigations for hazards must be incorporated into continued operator and maintainer training in order to sustain the training intervention.

Systems safety standards include:

USA:

MIL-STD 882 System Safety

UK:

Defence Policy for Health, Safety and Environmental Protection (DSA 01.1)

=== Force protection and survivability ===
Survivability is design features that reduce the risk of fratricide, detection and probability of an attack, and enable the crew to continue the mission and avoid acute or chronic illness, severe injury, disability or death in hostile environments. Elements of survivability include reducing susceptibility to a mishap or attack (protection against detection for example) and minimizing potential wounds or injury to personnel operating and maintaining the system. Survivability also includes protection from chemical, biological, radioactive and nuclear (CBRN) threats. and should include requirements to preserve integrity of the crew compartment, rapid egress in case of system destruction, and emergency systems for contingency management, escape, survival and rescue

Survivability is often categorized in the following topics:

- Reduce fratricide
- Reduce detectability
- Reduce probability of attack
- Minimize damage if attacked
- Minimize injury
- Minimize mental and physical fatigue
- Survive extreme environments

=== Habitability ===
Habitability is the application of human centered design to the physical environment (living areas, personal hygiene facilities, working areas, living areas, and personnel support areas) to sustain and optimize morale, safety, health, comfort and quality of life of personnel. Design aspects such as lighting; space; ventilation and sanitation; noise and temperature control; religious, medical and food services availability; berthing, bathing and personal hygiene are all aspects of habitability, and directly contribute to personnel effectiveness and mission accomplishment.

Habitability standards include:

Color Coordination Manual for Habitability DI-MISC 81123

Design Criteria Limits Noise Standards MIL-STD 1474
