= ISO/IEC 5218 =

Code for representation of human sex (male or female)

ISO/IEC 5218 Information technology — Codes for the representation of human sexes is an international standard that defines a representation of human sexes through a language-neutral single-digit code. It can be used in information systems such as database applications.

The four codes specified in ISO/IEC 5218 are:

- 0 = Not known;
- 1 = Male;
- 2 = Female;
- 9 = Not applicable.

The standard specifies that its use may be referred to by the designator "SEX".

The standard explicitly states that no significance is to be placed on the encoding of male as 1 and female as 2; the encoding merely reflects existing practice in the countries that initiated this standard. The standard also explains that it "meets the requirements of most applications that need to code human sexes. It does not provide codes for sexes that may be required in specific medical and scientific applications or in applications that need to code sex information other than for human beings." Since its 2022 revision, the standard also states that its scope does not cover human gender identities and therefore does not provide codes for those.

ISO/IEC 5218 was created by ISO's Data Management and Interchange Technical Committee, proposed in November 1976, and updated in June 2022. The standard is currently maintained by the ISO/IEC Joint Technical Committee (ISO/IEC JTC 1) subcommittee on Data management and interchange (ISO/IEC JTC 1/SC 32).

This standard is used in several national identification numbers. For example, the first digit of the French INSEE number and the first digit of the Republic of China National Identification Card (Chinese: 中華民國國民身分證) are based on ISO/IEC 5218 values.
