= Sanding block =

A sanding block is a flat or shaped block used to hold sandpaper. In its simplest form, it is a block of wood or cork with one smooth flat side. The user wraps the sandpaper around the block, and holds it in place either manually by hand, or by use of a holding mechanism in the block. Inserting a fitted piece of cardboard under the sandpaper, one can soften the impact on the wood and protect against tears or uneven wear on the sandpaper. This technique does make the block less flat over time as the cardboard wears in uneven fashion.

Fancier versions use clips, teeth or clamps to hold the paper in place. Commercial versions are constructed of various materials. They are usually sized to hold a quarter or half sheet of sandpaper. Some versions use the sandpaper belts intended for a power belt sander. Construction workers often use commercial one-piece sanding blocks consisting of a foam plastic block with an abrasive coating.

== Gallery ==
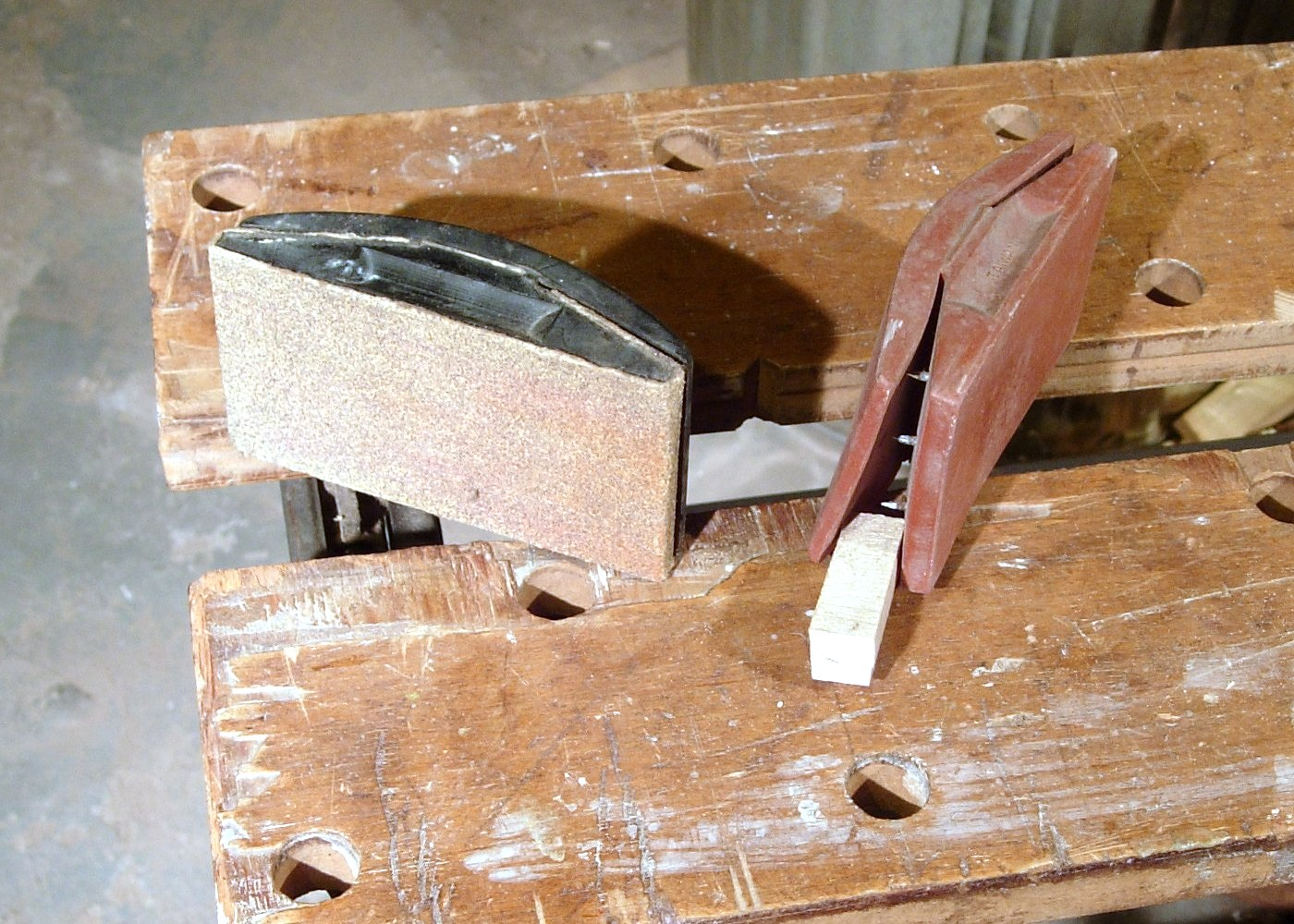
Rubber sanding blocks

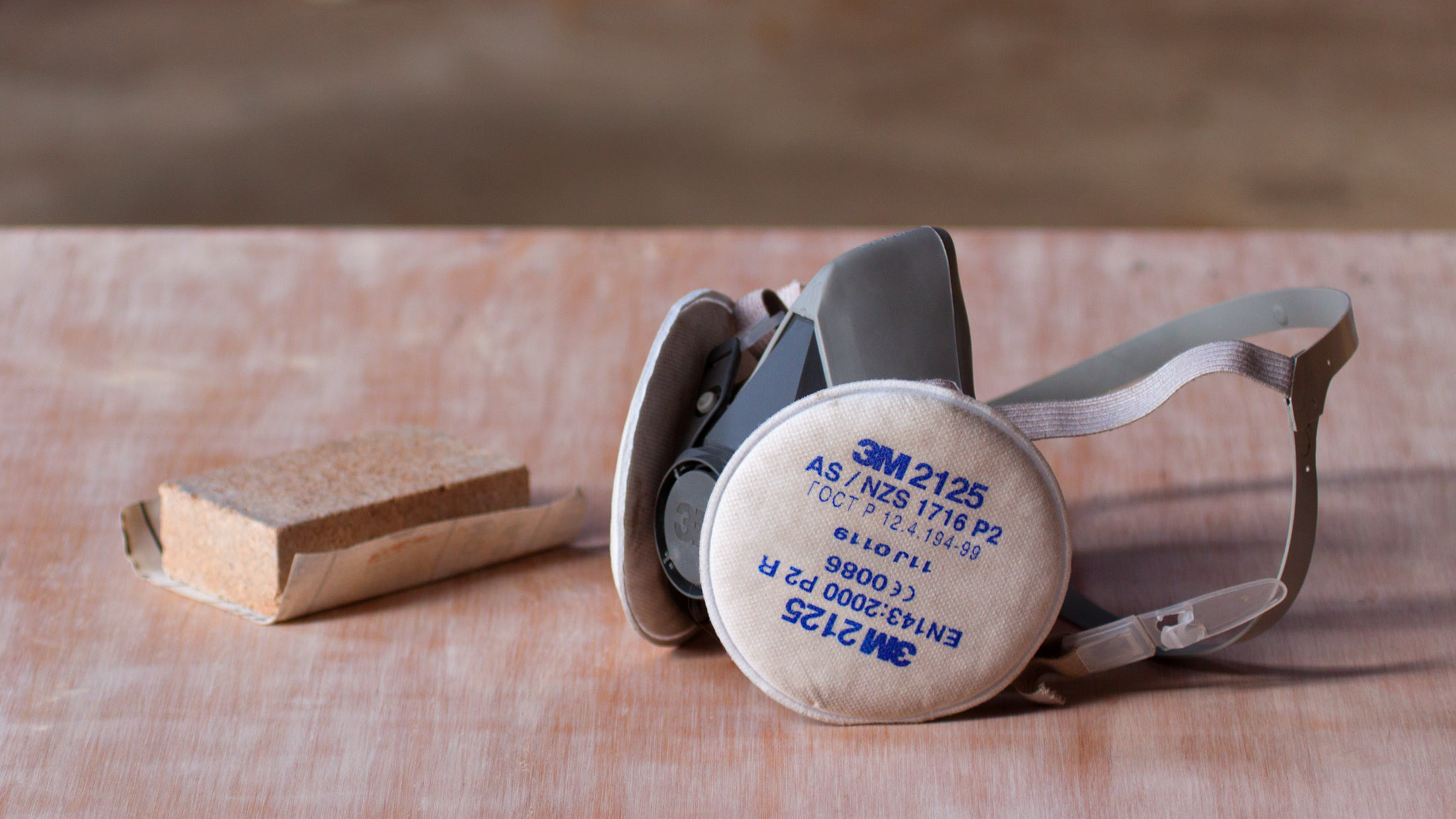
Sanding block with a respirator
