= ISO 6344 =

International standard

ISO 6344 is an international standard covering the definition and measurement of particle size for fused alumina (i.e., corundum) and silicon carbide grit used in coated abrasives, such as sandpaper. It is closely related to standards defined by FEPA (Federation of European Producers of Abrasives).

It has two parts (ISO 6344-1:1998 has been withdrawn):

- ISO 6344-2:2021: Determination and designation of grain size distribution. Part 2: Macrogrit sizes P12 to P220
- ISO 6344-3:2021: Determination and designation of grain size distribution. Part 3: Microgrit sizes P240 to P5000

== See also ==
- Sandpaper grit sizes
