= ISO 5127 =

ISO 5127 is an international standard in which terms and definitions for selected concepts relevant to the field of information and documentation are presented. Its full title is Information and documentation — Foundation and vocabulary. The standard was prepared by the third Subcommittee (SC 3), responsible for Terminology of information and documentation, of the ISO's forty-sixth Technical Committee (ISO/TC 46), responsible for Information and documentation.

Starting on 1981 the ISO 5127 was published as a series of documents (ISO 5127-1:1983, ISO 5127-2:1983, ISO 5127-3:1988, ISO 5127-3a:1981, ISO 5127-6:1983, ISO 5127-11:1987).

The revision of the series started in 1994 and it was concluded in 2001 with the publication of ISO 5127:2001.

The second edition of the document, ISO 5127:2017, replaced the first edition in 2017.

ISO 5127:2017 contains 2,000 definitions and their terms, arranged into 18 sections and 131 subsections.
