= Sandpaper =

Abrasive material used for smoothing softer materials

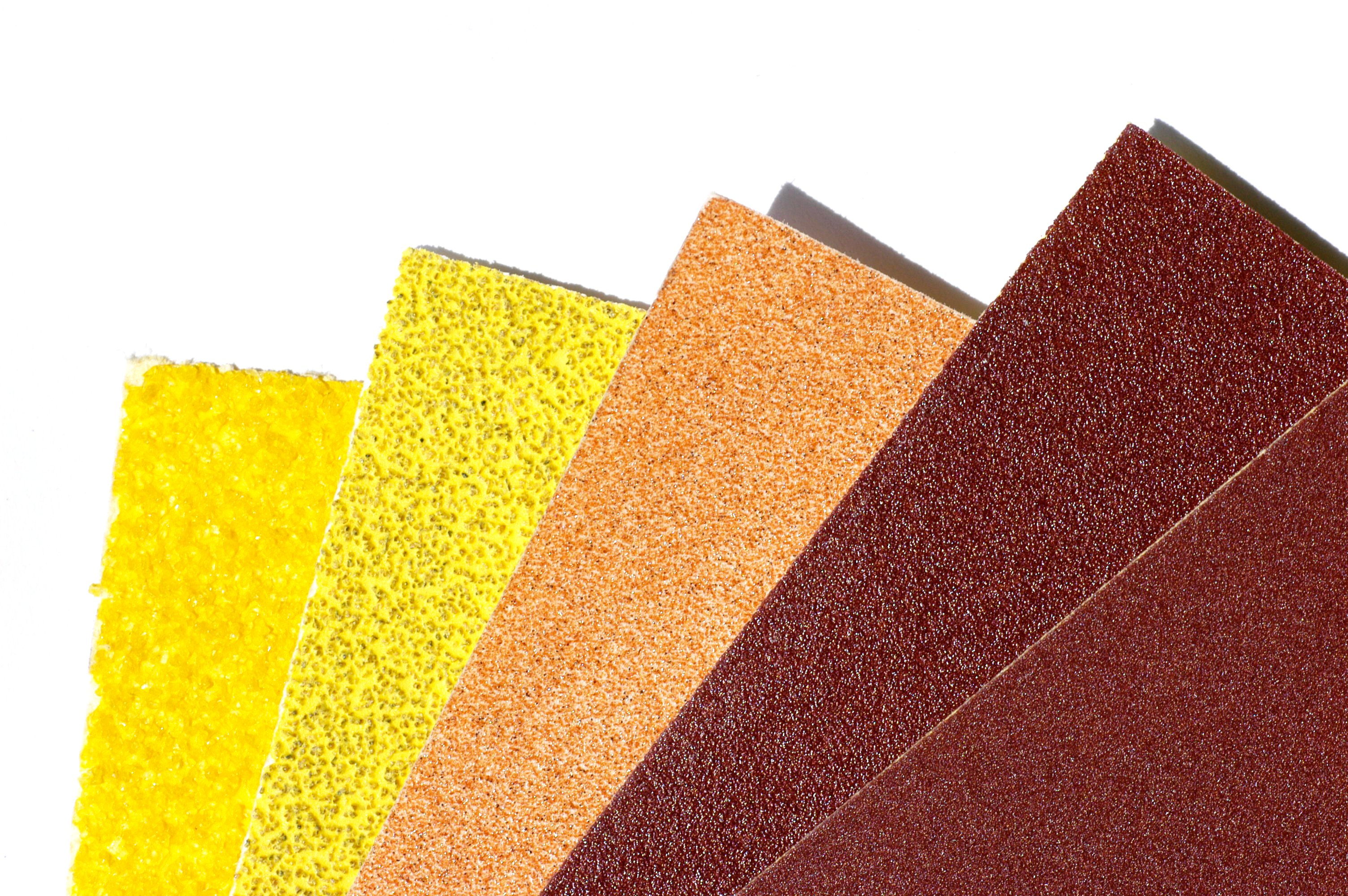
Sheets of sandpaper with different grit sizes (40 (coarse), 80, 150, 240, 600 (fine))

Sandpaper, also known as coated abrasive or emery paper, is a type of material that consists of sheets of paper or cloth with an abrasive substance (grit) glued to one face.

There are many varieties of sandpaper, with variations in the paper or backing, the material used for the grit, grit size, and the bond. It is common to use the name of the abrasive when describing the paper, e.g. "aluminium oxide cloth" or "silicon carbide paper".

Sandpaper is produced in a range of grit sizes and is used to remove material from surfaces, whether to make them smoother (for example, in painting and wood finishing), to remove a layer of material (such as old paint), or sometimes to make the surface rougher (for example, as a preparation for gluing).

== History ==
Since the ancient days, civilizations around the world used abrasive materials like fish scales or marble dust. The first recorded mention of a coated abrasive resembling modern-day sandpaper comes from 13th-century China, where crushed shells, seeds, and sand were bonded to parchment using natural gum. Modern coated abrasive technology developed throughout the Industrial Revolution, with inventors across the UK and USA refining the manufacturing process and trying new coating materials.

== Backing ==
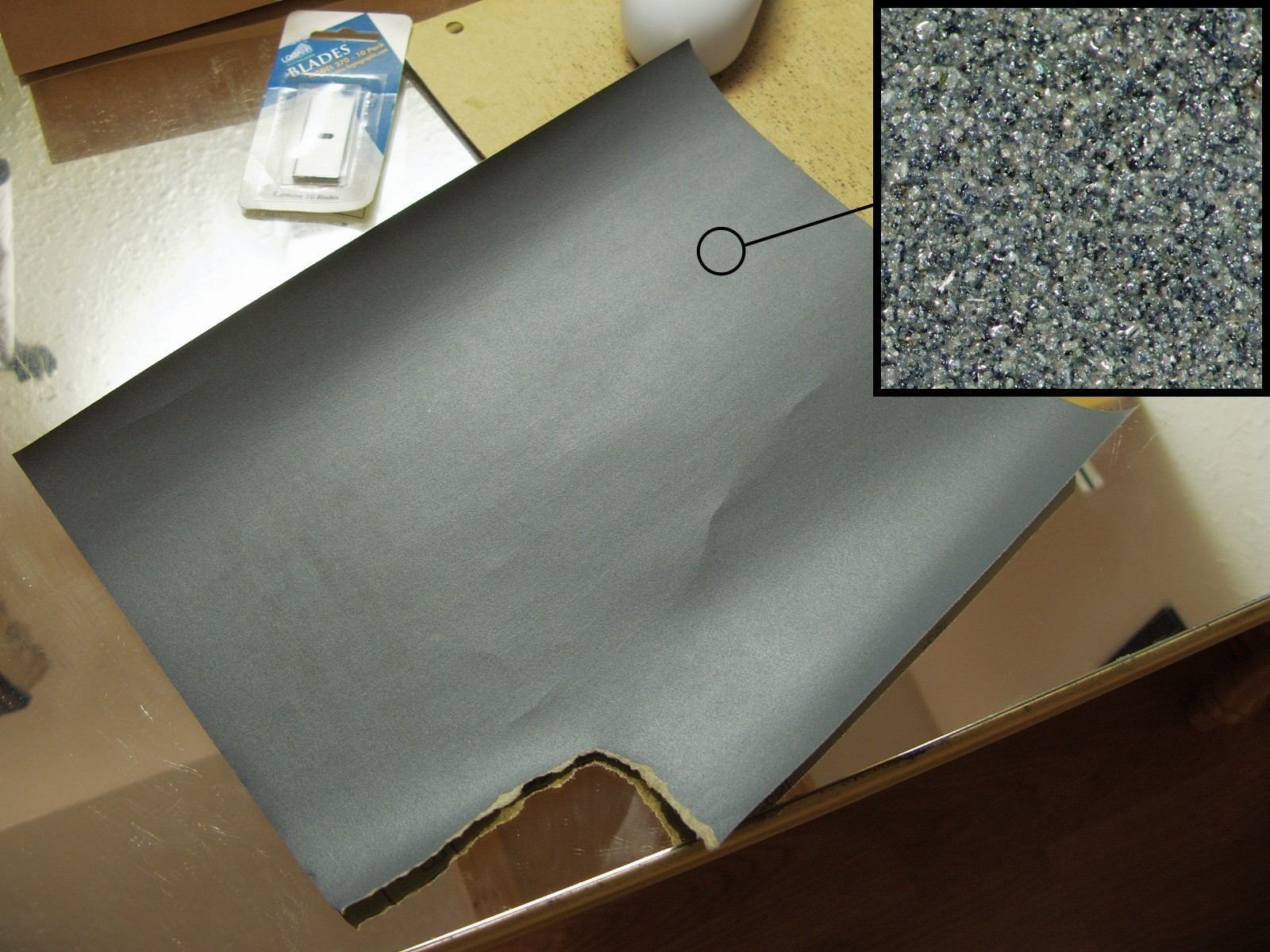
320 grit silicon carbide sandpaper, with close-up view

Depending on the desired application, different backing materials may be used for sandpaper. Some are more flexible, allowing sandpaper to follow irregular contours, while others are thicker and more suitable for heavy use.

Paper is the cheapest and the most used backing for coated abrasives, hence the common name "sandpaper". Paper backing comes in five weight categories: "A", "C", "D", "E" and "F", with A being the lightest and F the heaviest. For heavy-duty applications, such as disks for electric sanders, the paper may be reinforced with extra cloth fibers, resin or other additives.

In addition to paper, the most often used backing materials for coated abrasives are cloth (natural or synthetic), PET film, and vulcanized fibre.

Cloth backing typically comes in weights "J", "X" and "Y", from lightest to heaviest. Additional weight designators also exist, like "JF" or "XF" for variants with extra flexibility or "YY" for an even heavier option. Cloth offers high durability, and used in applications such as sanding belts.

PET film and vulcanized fibre are other high durability options. Film is also chosen for a very even thickness across the sheet, which yields a clean sand pattern. It comes in weights from 1 to 7. Fibre is a thick and extremely strong backing, generally only used for sanding disks.

=== Wet/dry paper ===
Paper backing may be coated in a layer of a waterproof material, such as latex. Those types of sandpaper, called "wet/dry" or "wet and dry", allow the use of a water-based lubricant, which is required for some applications. Wet/dry paper was invented by Francis Gurney Okie, an ink maker from Philadelphia. He was hired by 3M to work on his ideas, and in 1921 the company released the final product under the brand name "Wetordry".

Wet/dry sandpaper is more effective when used wet, because the water washes particles away from the grinding surface and reduces clogging.

== Abrasive coating ==
The backing is coated in abrasive particles using an adhesive. Different parameters of the coating, such as the particle composition, size, or used adhesive can be changed to produce sandpaper suitable for different purposes.

=== Grit materials ===
Most sandpaper in the past used flint as the abrasive material. However, flint particles are too soft for most kinds of sanding, so flint paper is now barely used.

Instead, most coated abrasives nowadays use synthetic grit material. The most commonly used one is aluminium oxide (commonly abbreviated as ALO). Aluminium oxide paper is strong, inexpensive and suitable for a wide variety of uses for both wood and metal. Ceramic materials such as alumina zirconia are a more premium alternative, offering superior sharpness and longevity for an expensive price. Silicon carbide is another common synthetic material. It is available in very fine grit sizes and is commonly used for wet sanding.

Some natural materials are also still in use. For example, emery is used for metal polishing, garnet is used for wood finishing, while crocus paper (made from iron oxide particles) is used for fine polishing of soft metals.

==== Friable grits ====
Abrasive materials can have a property called friability. Under the influence of heat produced from sanding, friable materials fracture at a controlled rate to expose new sharp edges. This allows them to last much longer compared to non-friable grits, which get dull and lose their abrasive properties with use.

=== Grit sizes ===
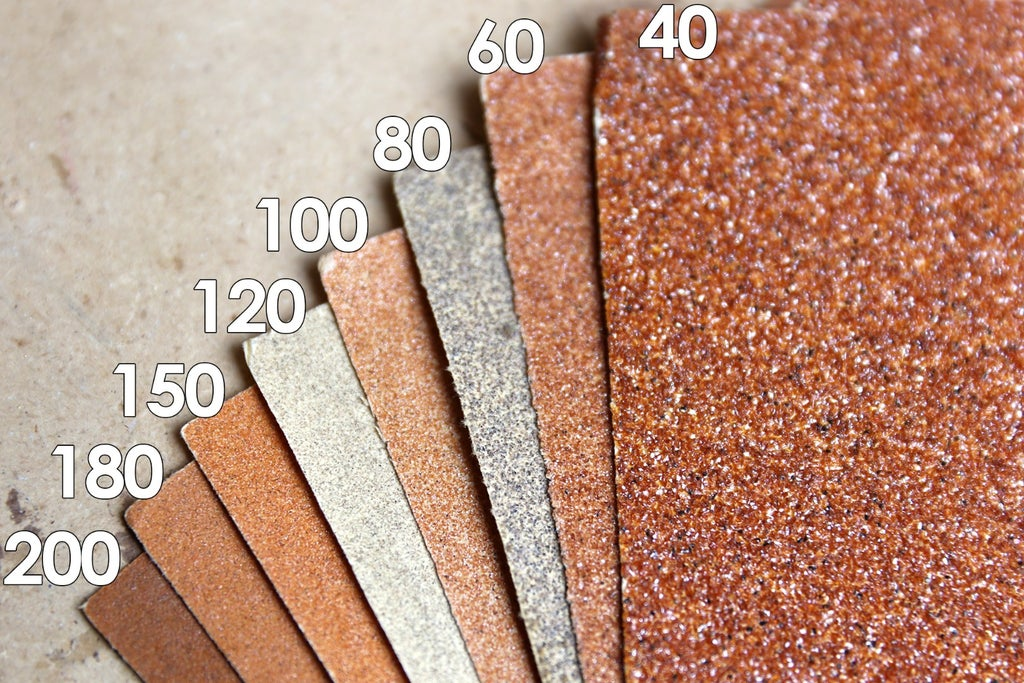
Sheets of sandpaper with different grit sizes (200 (bottom)–40 (top))

Grit size is the size of the abrasive particles attached to the sandpaper. Sandpaper comes in a variety of grit sizes, ranging from very coarse (≈2 mm) to ultrafine (<1 μm). Coarser grits efficiently sand hard surfaces, but also make it easier to accidentally damage fine details.

Several standards have been established for grit size, permissible tolerances and filtration method. The most prevalent standards are:

- The ANSI grade, also known as the CAMI (Coated Abrasive Manufacturers Institute) grade. Used in the United States.
- The FEPA (Federation of European Producers of Abrasives) grade, also called the P Grade. Used in Europe. The ISO 6344 standard is based on this scale.
- The JIS grade, mostly used in Japan and other Asian countries.
- Micron grading, which specifies the exact size of particles in microns. Mostly used for extra fine grits (60-0.1μm).

Some sandpapers may only use descriptive nomenclature such as "coarse", "medium" and "fine", without referring to any standard. Those names are not regulated in any way and may differ between manufacturers.

==== Size filtration ====
To achieve a uniform grit size, the crushed particles of the abrasive material must be filtered by size. Coarse grit particles are passed through a series of successively finer test sieves, with each successive layer blocking finer and finer particles. Medium grit particles are usually separated with air classification, which uses air flows to separate particles by weight. For the finest particles, water classification based on sedimentation is used, in which the particles are separated based on how quickly they settle to the bottom of the liquid tank.

=== Coating types ===
Sandpaper can be either closed coat or open coat. In closed coat sandpaper, approximately 90% to 95% of the surface is covered with abrasive grains. Closed coat sandpaper is good for hand sanding or working with harder materials. In comparison, 50% to 70% of the surface is covered with abrasive grains with open coat sandpaper. The separation between particles makes the sandpaper more flexible, which prevents the sandpaper from clogging. However, the gaps in grit coverage limits the sandpaper's ability to perform even polishing jobs. Open coat sandpaper is better for softer materials.

=== Adhesives ===
Different adhesives are used to bond the abrasive to the paper. Hide glue is still used, but this glue often cannot withstand the heat generated during machine sanding and is not waterproof. Waterproof sandpapers or wet/dry sandpapers use a resin bond and a waterproof backing.

Adhesives are commonly applied in two layers: the make-coat adhesive is applied before the abrasive coating and binds it to the backing, while the size-coat adhesive is applied after the coating to further fix it in place.

In traditional gravity coating process, a long ribbon of backing material sequentially receives the coating layers in the correct order. An alternative to that is electrostatic coating, which passes the adhesive-coated backing material and the grit particles through electric fields, causing the backing to receive negative charge and the grit to receive positive charge. This causes the particles to attract to the backing, sticking to the glue with higher strength than in gravity coating.

=== Anti-loading coatings ===
Sandpaper may be "stearated" where a dry lubricant (usually zinc stearate) is loaded to the abrasive. Stearated papers are useful in sanding coats of finish and paint as the stearate "soap" prevents clogging and increases the useful life of the sandpaper.

== Shapes and types ==
Sandpaper comes in a number of different shapes and sizes. The most typical shape is a 9 by 11 inches (23 by 28 cm) flat sheet, but other variants include abrasive rolls, sponges, belts for belt sanders and disks for disc and orbit sanders.

== See also ==
- Grain size
- Lapping film
- Sanding block
- Steel abrasive
- ISO 6344
