= ISO 7002 =

Published standard regarding agriculture

Titled as Agricultural food products—Layout for a standard method of sampling from a lot, the document provides a rule-based guidance on drafting a sampling method of agricultural food products for intended users. Except for milk products which ISO 707:1997 covers, the typical examples of the standards regulated by this document are

- ISO 3100-1:1991 Meat and meat products—Sampling and preparation of test samples—Part 1: Sampling
- ISO 6670:2002 Instant coffee—Sampling method for bulk units with liners
- ISO 13690:1999 Cereals, pulses and milled products—Sampling of static batches (bulk grain with a depth of 3 m)
- ISO 6644:2002 Flowing cereals and milled cereal products—Automatic sampling by mechanical means (bulk grain with a depth between 3–12 m)

The process of sampling is an important factor that determines a final result of an analyte, and therefore ISO 17025 uses it as one of the criteria for laboratory accreditation. The ISO 7002 has been commented by many users ever since its release

== See also ==
- Food safety
- ISO 874
- ISO 2859
- ISO 3951
- ISO 5667 - contains the guidances of water sampling for food industries
- ISO 6206
- ISO 8213
- List of ISO standards
