= ISO 6385 =

Published standard regarding ergonomics

The International Standard ISO 6385 "Ergonomic principles in the design of work systems" is published by the International Organization for Standardization and was last revised in 2016.

As the standard states in the 'Scope' section: “This International Standard is considered to be the core ergonomic standard from which many others on specific issues are derived”.

== See also ==
- International Organization for Standardization
