= GitLab Inc. =

Global software company

- Traded as: Nasdaq: GTLB (Class A); Russell 1000 component
- Industry: Software
- Founded: 2014; 12 years ago
- Founder: Dmytro Zaporozhets; Sytse Sijbrandij
- Headquarters: San Francisco
- Area served: Worldwide
- Key people: Sytse "Sid" Sijbrandij (President, Chairman); Bill Staples (CEO); Brian G. Robins (CFO); David DeSanto (CPO)
- Revenue: ▲US$759.2 million (2025)
- Operating income: ▲US$−143 million (2025)
- Net income: ▼US$−6.33 million (2025)
- Total assets: ▲US$1.399 billion (2025)
- Total equity: ▲US$821.3 million (2025)
- Number of employees: 2,375 (2025)
- Website: about.gitlab.com/company/

GitLab Inc. is an American company that operates and develops GitLab, an open-core DevOps software package that can develop, secure, and operate software. GitLab includes a distributed version control system based on Git, including features such as access control, bug tracking, software feature requests, task management, and wikis for every project, as well as snippets.

The open-source software project was created by Ukrainian developer Dmytro Zaporozhets and Dutch developer Sytse Sijbrandij. In 2018, GitLab Inc. was considered to be the first partly Ukrainian unicorn. GitLab has an estimated over 30 million registered users, including 1 million active licensed users. There are more than 3,300 code contributors and team members in 60+ countries.

== Overview ==
GitLab B.V. was established in 2014 in Utrecht to continue the development of the open-source code-sharing platform launched in 2011 by Dmytro (or Dmitriy) Zaporozhets in Ukraine. The company's co-founder Sytse Sijbrandij initially contributed to the project and decided to build a business around it.

GitLab offers its platform using a freemium model. Since its founding, GitLab Inc. has promoted remote work and is known as one of the largest all-remote companies in the world. By 2020, the company employed 1300 people in 65 countries.

== History ==
In June 2015, the company was changed to a United States corporation.

The company participated in the YCombinator seed accelerator Winter 2015 program. By 2015, notable customers included Alibaba Group and IBM.

In January 2017, a database administrator accidentally deleted the production database in the aftermath of a cyberattack, causing the loss of a substantial amount of issue data and merge request data. The recovery process was live-streamed on YouTube.

In April 2018, GitLab Inc. announced integration with Google Kubernetes Engine (GKE) to simplify the process of spinning up a new cluster to deploy applications.

In May 2018, GNOME moved to GitLab with over 400 projects and 900 contributors.

In June 2020, KDE moved to GitLab with over 2,600 projects and 2,700 contributors.

On August 1, 2018, GitLab Inc. started development of Meltano.

On August 11, 2018, GitLab Inc. moved from Microsoft Azure to Google Cloud Platform, making the service inaccessible to users in several regions including: Crimea, Cuba, Iran, North Korea, Sudan, and Syria, due to sanctions imposed by Office of Foreign Assets Control of the United States. In order to overcome this limitation, the non-profit organization Framasoft began providing a Debian mirror to make GitLab CE available in those countries.

In 2020 at the beginning of the COVID-19 pandemic, GitLab Inc. released "GitLab's Guide to All-Remote" as well as a course on remote management for the purpose of aiding companies interested in building all-remote work cultures. In April, the company expanded into the Australian and Japanese markets. By November, it was valued at more than $6 billion in a secondary market evaluation.

In 2021, OMERS participated in a secondary shares investment in GitLab Inc.

On March 18, 2021, GitLab Inc. licensed its technology to the Chinese company JiHu.

On June 30, 2021, GitLab Inc. spun out Meltano, an open source ELT platform.

On July 23, 2021, GitLab Inc. released its software Package Hunter, a Falco-based tool that detects malicious code, under the open-source MIT Licence.

On August 4, 2022, GitLab announced its plans for changing its Data Retention Policy and for automatically deleting inactive repositories which have not been modified for a year. As a result, in the following days GitLab received much criticism from the open-source community. Shortly after, it was announced that dormant projects would not be deleted, and would instead remain accessible in an archived state, potentially using a slower type of storage.

In May 2023, the company launched the "GitLab 16.0" platform as an AI-driven DevSecOps solution. It contained over 55 new features and enhancements.

In July 2024, Reuters reported that GitLab was exploring a potential sale after attracting acquisition interest, with cloud monitoring firm Datadog named as one of the interested parties.

In 2026, GitLab Inc. had over 10 thousand paying customers paying at least 5000 $/year, an increase of 8 % year-on-year.

=== Fundraising ===
GitLab Inc. initially raised $1.5 million in seed funding. Subsequent funding rounds include:

- September 2015 - $4 million in Series A funding from Khosla Ventures.
- September 2016 - $20 million in Series B funding from August Capital and others.
- October 2016 - $20 million in Series C funding from GV and others.
- September 19, 2018 - $100 million in Series D-round funding led by ICONIQ Capital.
- 2019 - $268 million in Series E-round funding led by Goldman Sachs and ICONIQ Capital at a valuation of $2.7 billion.

=== IPO ===
On September 17, 2021, GitLab Inc. publicly filed a Form S-1 registration statement for the initial public offering of its Class A common stock. The stock began trading on NASDAQ under the ticker "GTLB" on October 14, 2021. The IPO raised $650 million for the company.

== Adoption ==
GitLab Forge was officially adopted in 2023 by the French Ministry for Education to create a "Digital Educational Commons" of educational resources.

== Acquisitions ==
In March 2015, GitLab Inc. acquired the competing Git hosting service Gitorious, which had around 822,000 registered users at the time. The users of Gitorious were encouraged to migrate to GitLab, and the service was discontinued in June 2015.

On March 15, 2017, GitLab Inc. announced the acquisition of Gitter. Included in the announcement was the stated intent that Gitter would continue as a standalone project. Additionally, GitLab Inc. announced that the code would become open-source under an MIT License no later than June 2017.

In January 2018, GitLab Inc. acquired Gemnasium, a service that provided security scanners with alerts for known security vulnerabilities in open-source libraries of various languages. The service was scheduled for complete shut-down on May 15. Gemnasium features and technology was integrated into GitLab EE and as part of CI/CD.

On June 11, 2020, GitLab Inc. acquired Peach Tech, a security software firm specializing in protocol fuzz testing, and Fuzzit, a continuous "fuzz" security testing solution.

On June 2, 2021, GitLab Inc. acquired UnReview, a tool that automates software review cycles.

On December 14, 2021, GitLab Inc. announced that it had acquired Opstrace, Inc., developers of an open-source software monitoring and observability platform.

In March 2024, GitLab Inc. acquired Oxeye, a provider of cloud-native application security and risk management solutions. GitLab stated that the acquisition would accelerate its Static Application Security Testing roadmap and enhance its software composition analysis and compliance capabilities.

== Controversy ==
In December 2023, GitLab forced users in mainland China, Macau, and Hong Kong, to migrate to JiHu (gitlab.cn), the authorized Chinese entity which distributes and supports GitLab in the region, by February 2025, after which their accounts will be deleted. JiHu Information Technology was established by GitLab in 2021 to provide localized GitLab services tailored for the Chinese market, operating independently from GitLab.com.

In December 2024, JiHu faced severe internal and external criticism. A now-former JiHu GitLab DevOps architect publicly revealed an alleged "Endgame Plan" orchestrated by the company's CEO Liu Gang, which involved pressuring free GitLab CE users in China to become paying customers through potentially misleading legal tactics. Following these public accusations and a call for the CEO's removal, the architect was terminated and faced legal demands for retraction. He also made allegations regarding concealed American capital within JiHu GitLab, potentially posing national security risks due to the company's involvement with a Chinese aerospace entity.

== See also ==
- Comparison of source-code-hosting facilities
- Codeberg
- Collaborative software
- Gitea
- Kubernetes – Open-source container software
