= Comparison of source-code-hosting facilities =

A source-code-hosting facility (also known as forge software) is a file archive and web hosting facility for source code of software, documentation, web pages, and other works, accessible either publicly or privately. They are often used by open-source software projects and other multi-developer projects to maintain revision and version history, or version control. Many repositories provide a bug tracking system, and offer release management, mailing lists, and wiki-based project documentation. Software authors generally retain their copyright when software is posted to a code hosting facilities.

== General information ==
Name	Developer	Initial release	Free server?	Free client?	Associated collaborative development environment	Notes
Assembla	Assembla, Inc.	2005	No	Unknown	Unknown	
Azure DevOps Server	Microsoft	2012	No	No	Azure DevOps Services Microsoft Visual Studio	Most features are free for open source projects or teams of 5 members or less
Bitbucket	Atlassian	2008	No	No	Atlassian BitBucket Server, JIRA and Confluence	Denies service to Cuba, Iran, North Korea, Sudan, Crimea, Donetsk, and Luhansk
CloudForge	CollabNet	2012	No	Unknown	Unknown	
Codeberg	Codeberg e.V.	2019	Yes	Yes	Forgejo	Codeberg e.V. is a non-profit which operates a public Forgejo-based software forge and bug tracker, and related services such as Codeberg Pages, a Weblate translation server, and CI/CD features via Woodpecker CI.
Gitea	CommitGo, Inc.	2016-12	Yes	Yes	Gitea	Gitea is an open-source software tool funded on Open Collective that is designed for self-hosting, but also provides a free first-party instance.
Gitee	OSChina (CN)	2013				Gitee is a proprietary online forge.
GForge	The GForge Group, Inc.	2006	Partial	Yes	Cloud version – free up to 5 users. On-premises version – free up to 5 users.	GForge is free for open source projects.
GitHub	GitHub, Inc. (A subsidiary of Microsoft Corporation)	2008-04	No	Yes	Unknown	Denies service to Crimea, North Korea, Sudan, Syria List of government takedown requests
GitLab	GitLab Inc.	2011-09	Partial	Yes	GitLab FOSS – free software GitLab Enterprise Edition (EE) – proprietary	Denies service to Crimea, Cuba, Iran, North Korea, Sudan, Syria
GNU Savannah	Free Software Foundation	2001-01	Yes	Yes	Savane	For use by projects with GPL compatible licenses, subject to staff approval. Code access review.
Helix TeamHub	Perforce Software	1995	No	No	Cloud version – free up to 5 users. On-premises version requires a license.	Free cloud version has no limits on projects within 5gb storage limit. On-premises version has DevOps pipeline technology and free replicas.
Launchpad	Canonical	2004	Yes	No	Launchpad	Supports Bazaar and Git for version-controlled repository hosting.
OSDN	OSDN K.K.	2002–04	Unknown	Yes	Unknown	For open-source projects only. Ad-supported. Defunct as of April 9, 2025.
Ourproject.org	Comunes Collective	2002	Yes	Yes	FusionForge	For free software, free culture and free content projects.
OW2	OW2	2008	No	No	GitLab	Oriented on middleware technology.
Phabricator	Phacility, Inc.	2010	Yes	Yes	Phabricator	End of life.
SEUL	Unknown	1997-05	Unknown	No	Unknown	
SourceForge	Slashdot Media	1999-11	Yes	Yes	Apache Allura	For use by open-source projects. Ad-supported. Subject to American export restrictions, so denies service to Cuba, Iran, North Korea, Sudan, and Syria.
Name	Manager	Established	Server side: all free software	Client side: all-free JS code	Developed or used CDE	Notes

== Features ==
Name	Code review	Bug tracking	Web hosting	Wiki	Translation system	Shell server	Mailing list	Forum	Personal repository	Private repository	Announce	Build system	Team	Release binaries	Self-hosting
Assembla	Yes	Yes	Yes	Yes	Yes	No	No	No	Yes	Yes	Yes	Yes	Yes	Unknown	No
Azure DevOps Server	Yes	Yes	Yes	Yes	No	No	Yes	Yes	Yes	Yes	Yes	Yes	Yes	Yes	Commercially (Azure DevOps Server)
Bitbucket	Yes	Yes (Note: Anyone can submit Bug Reports without logging in.)	Yes	Yes	No	No	No	No	Yes	Yes (Note: Limited to 5 users on free plan (see Pricing – bitbucket.org))	No	Yes	Yes	No	Commercially (Bitbucket Server formerly Stash) (Note: Self hosted version is known as BitBucket Server and only supports Git repositories)
Buddy	Yes	Yes	No	No	No	No	Yes	Yes	Yes	Yes	Yes	Yes (Note: Builds are run in Docker containers)	Yes	Yes	Yes
CloudForge	Unknown	Yes	Yes	Yes	No	No	No	No	Unknown	Unknown	Unknown	Unknown	Unknown	Unknown	No
Codeberg	Yes	Yes	Yes	Yes	Yes	No	No	No	Yes	Yes (Note: Codeberg is only for public open-source code, private repositories exist but are not officially permitted except as needed to support FLOSS projects)	Unknown	Yes	Yes	Yes	Yes (Forgejo)
GForge	Yes	Yes	Yes	Yes	Yes	No	Yes	Yes	Yes	Yes	Yes	Yes	Yes	Yes	Yes
Gitea	Yes	Yes	No	Yes	No	No	No	No	Yes	Yes	Unknown	Yes	Yes	Yes	Yes
GitHub	Yes	Yes (Note: Requires one to log in to report a Bug.)	Yes	Yes	No	No	No	No	Yes	Yes	Yes	Yes	Yes	Yes	Commercially (GitHub Enterprise)
GitLab	Yes	Yes	Yes	Yes	No	No	No	No	Yes	Yes	Yes	Yes	Yes	Yes	Yes (Note: Has an open source FOSS edition and commercial Enterprise Edition)
GNU Savannah	Yes	Yes	Yes	No	No	Yes	Yes	No	No	No	Yes	No	Yes	Unknown	Yes
Helix TeamHub	Yes	Yes	No	Yes	No	No	Yes	Yes	Yes	Yes	No	Yes, with hooks. Jenkins, TeamCity, etc.	No	Yes	Yes
Kallithea	Yes	No	Yes	No	No	Unknown	No	No	Yes	Yes	No	No	Yes	Yes	Yes
Launchpad	Yes	Yes	No	No	Yes	No	Yes	No	Yes	Yes (Note: Currently only available for security vulnerability updates)	Yes	Yes (Note: Ubuntu)	Yes	Unknown	Yes
OSDN	Yes	Yes	Yes	Yes	No	Yes	Yes	Yes	Yes	No	Yes	No	Yes	Yes	No
Ourproject.org	Unknown	Yes	Yes	Yes	No	Unknown	Yes	Yes	Unknown	Unknown	Unknown	Unknown	Unknown	Unknown	Yes
Phabricator	Yes	Yes	Yes	Yes	Unknown	Yes	Unknown	Yes	Unknown	Unknown	Unknown	Unknown	Unknown	Unknown	Yes
RhodeCode	Yes	No	Yes	No	No	Unknown	No	No	Yes	Yes	Yes	No	Yes	Yes	Yes
SourceForge	Yes	Yes	Yes	Yes	No	Yes	Yes	Yes	Yes	Yes (Note: Private repositories can be used to set up a project before going live. However, SourceForge requires that the project remains open source. See SourceForge Support.)	Yes	No	Yes	Yes	Yes
Name	Code review	Bug tracking	Web hosting	Wiki	Translation system	Shell server	Mailing list	Forum	Personal repository	Private repository	Announce	Build system	Team	Release binaries	Self-hosting

== Version control systems ==
Name	CVS	Git	Hg	SVN	BZR	TFVC	Perforce	Fossil
Assembla	No	Yes	No	Yes	No	No	Yes	No
Azure DevOps Server	No	Yes	No	No	No	Yes	No	No
Bitbucket	No	Yes	Until Feb 2020	No	No	No	No	No
Buddy	No	Yes	No	No	No	No	No	No
Codeberg	No	Yes	No	No	No	No	No	No
GForge	Yes	Yes	No	Yes	No	No	No	No
Gitea	No	Yes	No	No	No	No	No	No
GitHub	No	Yes	No	Partial, until Jan 2024	No	No	No	No
GitLab	No	Yes	No	No	No	No	No	No
GNU Savannah	Yes	Yes	Yes	Yes	Yes	No	No	No
Kallithea	No	Yes	Yes	No	No	No	No	No
Launchpad	Import only	Yes	Import only	Import only	Yes	No	No	Unknown
Ourproject.org	Yes	No	No	Yes	No	No	Unknown	Unknown
OW2	Dropped	Yes	No	Dropped	No	No	No	No
Perforce TeamHub	No	Yes	Yes	Yes	No	No	Yes	No
Phabricator	No	Yes	Yes	Yes	No	No	No	No
RhodeCode	No	Yes	Yes	Yes	No	No	No	No
SEUL.org	Yes	No	No	Yes	No	No	Unknown	Unknown
SourceForge	Dropped	Yes	Yes	Yes	Dropped	No	Unknown	No
Name	CVS	Git	Hg	SVN	BZR	TFVC	Perforce	Fossil

== Popularity ==
Name	Users	Projects
Assembla	Unknown	526,581+
Bitbucket	5,000,000	Unknown
Buddy	Unknown	Unknown
CloudForge	Unknown	Unknown
Codeberg	450,000	745,000
Gitea	Unknown	Unknown
GitHub	180,000,000	330,000,000
GitLab	31,190,000	546,000 (Note: GitLab is not fundamentally organized by projects, so the count is somewhat difficult.)
GNU Savannah	93,346	3,848
Launchpad	3,965,288	40,881
OSDN	54,826	6,294
Ourproject.org	6,353	1,846
OW2	Unknown	Unknown
SEUL	Unknown	Unknown
SourceForge	3,700,000	500,000
Name	Users	Projects

Discontinued: CodePlex, Gna!, Google Code.

== Specialized hosting facilities ==
The following are open-source software hosting facilities that only serve a specific narrowly focused community or technology.

Name	Ad-free	CVS	Git	SVN	Arch	Notes
Drupal	Yes	No	Yes	No	No	Only for Drupal related projects.
freedesktop.org	Yes	No	Yes	No	No	Only for interoperability and shared base technology for free software desktop environments on Linux and other Unix-like operating systems, including the X Window System (X11) and cairo (graphics).
mozdev.org	Yes	Yes	Unknown	No	No	Only for Mozilla-related projects. Defunct as of July 2020.
Name	Ad-free	CVS	Git	SVN	Arch	Notes

== Former hosting facilities ==
- Alioth (Debian) – In 2018, Alioth has been replaced by a GitLab based solution hosted on salsa.debian.org. Alioth has been finally switched off in June 2018.
- BerliOS – abandoned in April 2014
- Betavine – abandoned somewhere in 2015.
- CodeHaus – shut down in May 2015
- CodePlex – shut down in December 2017.
- Fedora Hosted – closed in March 2017
- Gitorious – shut down in June 2015.
- Gna! – shut down in 2017.
- Google Code – closed in January 2016, all projects archived. See http://code.google.com/archive/.
- java.net – Java.net and kenai.com hosting closed April 2017.
- OSDN - shut down in April 2025.
- Phabricator – wound down operations 1 June 2021, all projects continued to be hosted with very limited support after 31 August 2021.
- Tigris.org – shut down in July 2020.
- Mozdev.org - shut down in July 2020.

== See also ==
- Comparison of version-control software
- Distributed version control
- Forge (software)
- List of free software project directories
- List of version-control software
- Source code escrow for closed-source software
- Version control (source-code-management systems)
