= Gitee =

Proprietary Chinese software hosting platform

- Website type: DevOps platform
- Available in: English; Chinese
- Headquarters: China
- Area served: Worldwide, mainly China
- Owner: OSChina
- Industry: Software
- Website: gitee.com
- Commercial: Yes
- Registration: Optional
- Users: 8 million
- Launched: 2013
- Current status: Online

Gitee (simplified Chinese: 码云; traditional Chinese: 碼雲; pinyin: Mǎyún) is a proprietary online forge that allows software version control using Git and is intended primarily for the hosting of open source software. It is a fork of Gitea and uses a compatible API. It was launched by Shenzhen-based OSChina in 2013. Gitee claims to have more than 10 million repositories and 5 million users.

Gitee was chosen by the Ministry of Industry and Information Technology of the Chinese government to make an independent, open-source code hosting platform for China.

== Censorship ==
On 18 May 2022, Gitee announced all code will be manually reviewed before public availability. Gitee did not specify a reason for the change, though there was widespread speculation it was ordered by the Chinese government amid increasing online censorship in China.

== See also ==
- Comparison of source-code-hosting facilities
- GitLab
- Bitbucket
- Gitea
