= SourceForge (disambiguation) =

SourceForge is a brand name that may refer to:

- SourceForge (SF.net), a source code repository and centralized location for software developers to control and manage open source software development
- SourceForge Enterprise Edition (SFEE), the former name of TeamForge, a proprietary collaborative application lifecycle management software forge
- SourceForge, Inc., the former name of Geeknet, which owned SF.net and formerly developed SourceForge Enterprise Edition
- SourceForge.JP, the former name of OSDN, a Japanese site similar to SF.net, and spun off to a separate company in 2007
