= TeamForge =

Formerly SourceForge Enterprise Edition

- Original author: VA Software
- Developer: CollabNet
- Initial release: 2002; 24 years ago
- Stable release: 19.3.382-652 / October 30, 2019; 6 years ago
- Written in: Java
- Platform: Java
- Available in: English
- Type: Application lifecycle management
- License: Proprietary
- Website: www.collab.net/products/teamforge-alm

TeamForge (formerly SourceForge Enterprise Edition or SFEE) is a proprietary collaborative application lifecycle management forge supporting version control and a software development management system.

== Background ==
TeamForge provides a front-end to a range of software development lifecycle services and integrates with a number of free software / open source software applications (such as PostgreSQL and Subversion).

Its predecessor, SourceForge, started as open source software, but a version of it (based on the v2.5 prototype code) was eventually relicensed under a proprietary software license as SourceForge Enterprise Edition, which was re-written in Java and marketed for offshore outsourcing software development.

The original codebase of SourceForge (code-named "Alexandria") was forked by the GNU Project as GNU Savannah; then, Savannah was also modified at CERN and released as Savane. SourceForge was also later forked as GForge by one of the SourceForge programmers, and then GForge was itself forked as FusionForge by three GForge developers.

Originally sold by VA Software, SourceForge Enterprise Edition was acquired by CollabNet on April 24, 2007. CollabNet subsequently integrated SourceForge Enterprise Edition with its own CollabNet Enterprise Edition and product, taking architectural and product elements from both systems, and re-launched the enhanced product as TeamForge in 2008. Since 2007, TeamForge has continued to undergo development, adding in a series of application lifecycle management tools.

== See also ==
- Comparison of source-code-hosting facilities
