= Sidekiq =

- Developer: Mike Perham
- Release: February 5, 2012; 14 years ago
- Stable release: 8.1.7 / 17 August 2026; 2 months ago
- Written in: Ruby
- Operating system: Cross-platform
- Available in: English
- Type: Working queue
- License: LGPLv3
- Website: sidekiq.org
- Repository: github.com/sidekiq/sidekiq

Sidekiq is an open source background job framework written in Ruby.

== Architecture ==
Sidekiq uses Redis for its persistent data store. Each job is stored as a map of key/value pairs, serialized using JSON. Developers can use any programming language to create jobs by constructing the necessary JSON and pushing it into the queue in Redis. A Sidekiq process reads jobs from that Redis queue, using the First In First Out (FIFO) model, and executes the corresponding Ruby code. Job processing is asynchronous, allowing a web-serving thread to continue serving new requests rather than be blocked processing slower tasks.

Sidekiq can be used standalone, or integrated with a Ruby on Rails web application. Sidekiq is multithreaded so multiple jobs can execute concurrently within one process. A large scale application may have dozens or hundreds of Sidekiq processes executing thousands of jobs per second.

Sidekiq comes with a graphical web interface for inspecting and managing job data.

== Business model ==
Sidekiq uses an Open Core business model to provide sustainability for the open source project. The company behind Sidekiq, Contributed Systems, sells closed-source commercial versions, Sidekiq Pro and Sidekiq Enterprise, which contain additional features not included in the open source version.

== Reception and use ==
Sidekiq is described as “well-known queue processing software”.

It's used by Ruby applications like Mastodon, Diaspora, GitLab and Discourse, that need to run tasks in the background, without making web requests wait. Sidekiq is also used to submit threads to the PHASTER phage search tool.
