= Gna! =

Association of software developers

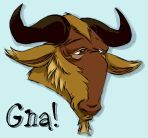
GNA! logo

Gna! was a centralized location where software developers could develop, distribute and maintain free software. The service was shut down in 2017 after 13 years in service for dozens of software projects and millions of downloads served.

In August 2022, Gna! was relaunched by Loïc Dachary as a paid service for hosting Forgejo instances.

== History ==
In the beginning, GNA (recursively acronymed "Gna's Not Axis"), was an association formed by Loïc Dachary for the distribution of free software.

On the 12 April 2001, GNA turned into the French chapter of Free Software Foundation (FSF).

At the end of 2003, the GNU Savannah server was replaced by FSF after a security compromise. A dispute broke out between FSF, who owned Savannah, and Savannah's maintainers, including developers of the Savannah software over the levels of administration the FSF should be given. FSF announced that it was going to switch to GForge, leaving frayed tempers among the developers, as result of a conflict about Savannah maintainers' role.

In January 2004, Loïc Dachary (who also started GNU Savannah) and several former GNU Savannah maintainers set up "Gna!" as a continuation of the Savannah project, but hosted on servers owned by the Free Software Foundation France. Gna! is paradoxically recursively acronymed "Gna's Not an Acronym!". It is managed by a self-organized team, supported by Free Software Foundation France.

For the hosted projects, Gna! provides source code version control (CVS, and SVN), a download space, project monitoring facilities, etc.

A notable exception to other free software community portals is Gna's strict licensing restrictions: only GNU General Public License compatible projects may be developed on the server. This is one of the reasons why it is significantly smaller than other portals. Its small userbase is advertised as a positive because it generally aids in the quick resolution of problems; a process which can take weeks on the larger sites.

In November 2016, the Gna! project announced it would soon be closing down, and explained "soon" to mean "within 3 months [of February 2017], or when the hardware dies."

On 24 May 2017, Gna! servers were shut down.

In April 2022, Loïc Dachary and Aravinth Manivannan launched a paid service for hosting Gitea (later Forgejo) instances, called Hostea. In August 2022 Hostea was renamed to Gna!.

In February 2023, Dachary said he would pause the Gna! project until January 2024, citing that he won't be able to work on Gna! alongside two other projects he was already committed to at the time. Subsequently, the Gna! login page was taken down in March.

As of January 2026, the Gna! website and forums remain completely inaccessible.

== Archive ==
Gna! project have been archived by Archive Team. Code repositories, sites, downloads, mailing lists from Gna! can be found at Gna! Archiveteam page.

== Impact and reception ==
Among other projects Gna! hosted the popular software MyPaint and the games Freeciv, The Battle for Wesnoth, Warzone 2100, Hedgewars, and Warmux; providing 100,000s of software downloads every month to the users.

== See also ==
- Comparison of open source software hosting facilities
