= Betavine =

Website created by English telecommunications company Vodafone

- Website type: Collaborative Software Development
- Available in: English
- Owner: Vodafone Group
- Creator: Vodafone Group
- Revenue: N/A
- Website: www.betavine.net
- Commercial: No
- Launched: 2007; 19 years ago
- Current status: Inactive

Betavine was an open community and resource website, created and managed by Vodafone Group R&D, for the mobile development community in order to support and stimulate the development of new applications for mobile and Internet communications. The Betavine website allows developers to upload and profile their alpha-stage and beta-stage applications, provides interaction tools for members to share knowledge and give feedback on apps, and discuss topics in mobile. Betavine also contains a growing resources section with technical topics and APIs.

The Betavine website was built using open source components so there are a number of resources for open source in mobile - such as the Betavine Forge where developers can share code snippets, post projects, and collaborate on projects. The recently publicised Vodafone Mobile Connect Card Driver for Linux is hosted here, for example. The site offers a virtual Academy where new developers can learn about mobile technology and how to set up a mobile business.

== Betavine ==
The mission stated on the Betavine website is "to support the wider development community in imagining, developing, testing and launching great new applications for mobile, wireless and Internet communications. We are platform agnostic and operating system agnostic. Everyone is welcome to register as a member, download and play with any application, contribute to discussion threads and create or comment on blog entries. As a developer you can upload your own applications, showcase your work and get useful feedback from other members. Students should keep an eye peeled for great competitions and other opportunities."

Vodafone Betavine also offers internships, "externships" and competitions for students.

There are now a number of competitions on Betavine, some for students only, some for anyone who cares to enter, and some are being run by partners of Betavine:

- Student Competitions
  - Campus Life 2008
  - Nokia WidSets Challenge
  - Vodafone Egypt Competition
  - Guidelines
  - Winners 2007
- Partner Competitions
  - Mob4hire August 2008

Betavine launched a mobile internet site at the beginning of 2008, using the .mobi domain convention. The stated goal of launching betavine.mobi is to make the downloading of mobile applications profiled on Betavine even easier, and to help end-users find apps that are compatible with their mobile device by automatically detecting the device model and matching that with a database of technical specs. In May 2008, Betavine launched a pilot with Vodafone Spain which links directly to betavine.mobi from the Vodafone Live! Portal. It's clear from the download figures on the main website www.betavine.net that this is having a huge positive impact on the number of applications being found, downloaded, and being given feedback.

Vodafone is one of the key backers of the dotMobi consortium (the informal name of mTLD Top Level Domain, Ltd.), which is promoting the use of the .mobi domain name in order to increase consumer confidence that an Internet site or service will work on their mobile phones.

As of July 5, 2015, Betavine is inactive and site is down. There have been no tweets since August 25, 2010 so it is assumed the group closed down round then.

== Betavine Forge ==
Vodafone Betavine runs a version of the GForge open-source collaborative development portal in order to host mobile open-source projects, code snippets, and other resources for developers.

Some of the hosted projects are:

- Vodafone Mobile Connect Card driver for Linux: GPRS/UMTS/HSDPA device manager written in Python, licensed under the GPL
- Betavine Connection Manager: GPRS/UMTS/HSxPA device manager for Linux written in Python, licensed under the GPL
- Vodafone MobileScript for Windows Mobile: common framework using an ECMAScript OS engine
- Linux Environment for Mobile Networks: studies the possibility of remotely running applications over Mobile Networks

Since the launch of the Asus EEEPC, which has been hugely popular, a new version of the Vodafone Connect Card linux driver for UMPC (Ultra Mobile PCs) has been getting a lot of downloads.

The original Vodafone Connect Card linux driver for Linux has now been rewritten to interoperate with Network Manager, and renamed as 'Betavine Connection Manager'.

== See also ==
- Comparison of free software hosting facilities
- SourceForge
- Google Code
- CodePlex
- Freshmeat
- Ohloh
