= Java.net =

java.net
- Website type: News and Collaborative revision control
- Available in: English
- Dissolved: 28 April 2017
- Owner: Oracle
- Website: www.java.net
- Registration: Optional
- Launched: 2003
- Current status: Permanently shut down

java.net was a Java technology related community website. It also offered a web-based source code repository for Java projects. It was shut down in April 2017.

== History ==
java.net was announced by Sun Microsystems during JavaOne 2003.

In January 2010, Oracle announced that it will migrate java.net portal to Project Kenai codebase, encouraging users to move their Kenai projects to java.net.

In June 2016, Oracle announced that "the Java.net and Kenai.com forges will be going dark on April 28, 2017."

== Javapedia ==
The Javapedia project was launched in June 2003 during the JavaOne developer conference. It is part of java.net.

The project aims at creating an online encyclopedia covering all aspects of the Java platform. The Javapedia project is openly inspired by Wikipedia.

The prominent differences between Wikipedia and Javapedia include feature restrictions (for example, editing is open to registered users only), software used (TWiki), links (camelCase is used), and content licensing (Creative Commons 1.0 Attribution license).

== See also ==
- Comparison of source code hosting facilities
