= Integrator workflow =

Integrator workflow, also known as Integration Manager Workflow, is a method to handle source code contributions in work environments using distributed version control.

== Scenario ==
Frequently, in a distributed team, each developer has write access to their own public repository and they have read access to everyone else’s. There is also a dedicated repository, the blessed repository, which contains the "reference" version of the project source code. To contribute to this, developers create their own public clone of the project and push their changes to those. Then, they request one or more maintainers of the blessed repository to pull in their changes.

== Implementations ==
- GitHub
- Bitbucket
- CodePlex
