= Forgejo =

Free and open-source software forge

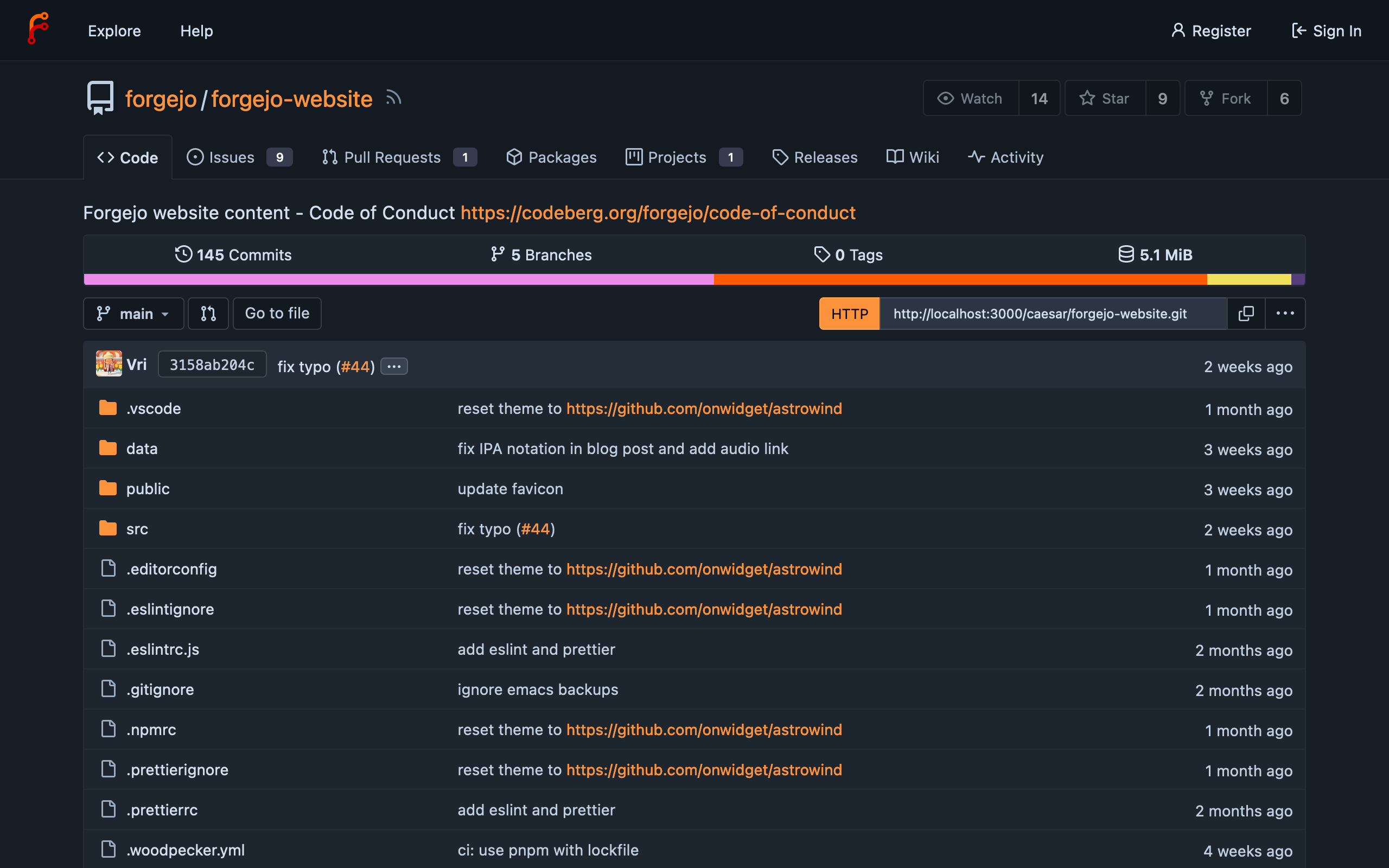
- A screenshot of a Forgejo repository
- Release: 15 December 2022
Stable release
- 16: 16.0.4 / 10 September 2026; 2 months ago
- 15 LTS: 15.0.8 / 10 September 2026; 2 months ago
- Written in: Go, JavaScript
- Operating system: Cross-platform
- Platform: x86-64, ARM
- Available in: Multi-lingual
- Type: Collaborative software development (forge)
- License: GNU General Public License v3.0 or later
- Website: forgejo.org
- Repository: codeberg.org/forgejo/forgejo

Forgejo (Note: Pronounced /fɔːrˈdʒeɪjoʊ/; from Esperanto forĝejo, pronounced [forˈd͡ʒejo], meaning "forge".) is a cross-platform, open-source web server for hosting a software development forge. Forgejo uses the Git version control system for source code revisioning and also allows developers to use features like bug tracking, code review, continuous integration, kanban boards, issue tracking system tickets, and wikis with their projects. The package is designed to be self-hosted by developers, and a public instance is provided to try out the software, however forges that are hosted by organizations such as Codeberg are more commonly used. Forgejo can be hosted on most platforms that support the Go runtime, including macOS, except Microsoft Windows which is no longer supported since 2024. Packages are provided for various Linux distributions.

== History ==
Forgejo was created in December 2022 as a fork of Gitea. The fork occurred after a for-profit limited corporation run by the lead maintainer of the project, Lunny Xiao, silently transferred Gitea's trademarks and operations to the company and began to establish an open-core model.

After it became public, Gitea contributors signed an open letter asking for the project's trademarks and domains to be placed under community management. After that was rejected, the project was forked. Codeberg, one of the major forges using Gitea at the time, migrated to Forgejo and has become the de jure lead maintainers of the project. Codeberg e.V., a registered nonprofit association, manages Forgejo's domain names and trademarks on behalf of the project. Codeberg's public instance was migrated from Gitea to Forgejo at the end of April 2023.

While initially being synchronized with the Gitea codebase, Forgejo eventually abandoned the practice and split from Gitea following version 1.21 in February 2024, In August 2024, Forgejo moved from the MIT license to the copyleft GNU General Public License. While the original code is still MIT-licensed, the overall project is licensed under the GPL.

One of the main goals for the future of Forgejo is their plan to implement interoperability between different installations. While repositories can be mirrored from any other Git forge, the project has begun work on implementing support for the ActivityPub protocol, allowing users to collaborate with each other using Forgejo's features. The project has received funding from the NLnet organization for both the protocol extension needed to accommodate the feature subset, dubbed as "ForgeFed", and its implementation into Forgejo. As of 2025, the ability to federate "stars" on repositories across Forgejo installations has been built, while other forge packages such as GitLab have also begun work on implementing support for ForgeFed.

In April 2026, the Dutch government announced that it would pilot a self-hosted Git forge based on Forgejo as an alternative to GitHub and GitLab.

=== Release history ===
The first stable version, 1.18, was released in December 2022. Version 1.19 followed in March 2023, introducing a built-in continuous integration system called Actions — modelled on GitHub Actions — and a package registry with support for Docker and Cargo.

Version 1.20, whose first release candidate appeared in June 2023, added moderation options including the ability to block other users, extended package registry support (Debian, Go, Swift), and accessibility improvements. Version 1.21, released in November 2023, expanded on user moderation, added administrator email notifications for new account registrations, further extended the Actions CI/CD system, and improved detection of programming languages in repositories.

Following the transition to a hard fork, Forgejo adopted Semantic Versioning and released version 7.0 on April 23, 2024. This was the first version with long-term support (LTS), receiving critical bug and security fixes until July 2025. It also added support for four new interface languages (Bulgarian, Esperanto, Filipino, and Slovenian), a code search feature, and activity graphs. Version 8.0 followed on July 30, 2024, with a security patch release (8.0.1) on August 9, 2024.

== Infrastructure ==
Forgejo can be installed directly on Linux systems; due to its comparatively low resource requirements it can also run on embedded hardware such as a Raspberry Pi or a network-attached storage device. For other operating systems, including macOS, running Forgejo in Docker is recommended.

A free public instance operated by Codeberg e.V. is available for open-source projects. For Android, the free app GitNex provides repository management for Forgejo instances. A command-line tool called tea is available for Linux, Windows, and macOS.

== Users ==
Codeberg is the largest server running Forgejo and is one of the project's primary contributors, hosting more than 300,000 repositories as of November 2025.

The Fedora Linux project is replacing their forge Pagure with Forgejo. Following the use of Copilot by GitHub, some people have moved to Codeberg or self-hosting Forgejo.

== See also ==
- Comparison of source-code-hosting facilities
- Free software movement – Social movement
- Self-hosting – Practice of running a website using a private web server
