= Alioth (Debian) =

FusionForge system for free software and documentation development

- Middleware: FusionForge
- Platform: Debian
- Website: alioth.debian.org

Alioth was a FusionForge system run by the Debian project for development of free software and free documentation, especially software or documentation to do with Debian.

Most of the projects hosted by Alioth were packaging existing software in the Debian format. However, there were some notable non-Debian projects hosted, like SANE project.

== History ==
Alioth had been announced in March 2003. Originally Alioth was to be hosted on the SourceForge code base; the Free Software version of GForge was chosen later as it avoided the need to duplicate effort spent on rebranding SourceForge. Alioth began running a GForge descendant called FusionForge in 2009. In 2018, Alioth was replaced by a GitLab based solution hosted on salsa.debian.org; Alioth was switched off in June 2018.

Alioth administrators have included Raphaël Hertzog and Roland Mas.
