= MyPaint =

Raster graphics editor

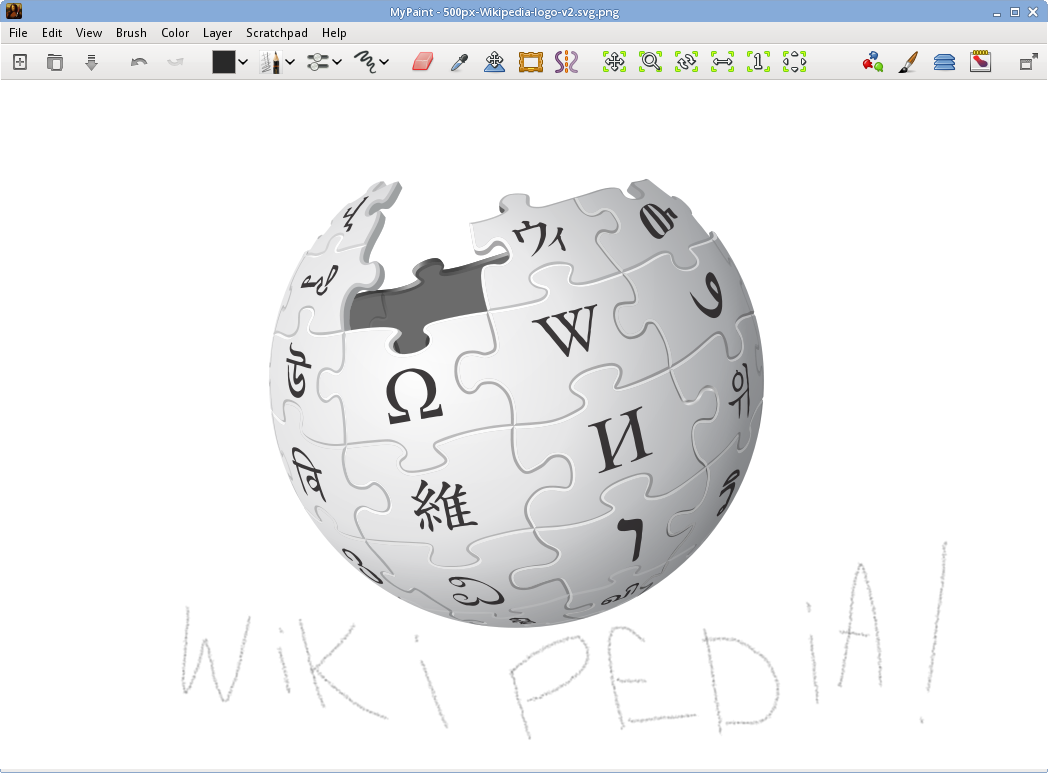
- MyPaint 1.1.0
- Original author: Martin Renold
- Developer: MyPaint Contributors
- Release: March 12, 2005; 21 years ago
- Stable release: 2.0.1 / 29 May 2020
- Preview release: 2.0.2-alpha / 29 May 2020
- Written in: C, C++ and Python (GTK)
- Operating system: Linux, macOS, Windows
- Platform: IA-32 and x64
- Type: Raster graphics editor
- License: GPL-2.0-or-later
- Website: mypaint.app
- Repository: github.com/mypaint/mypaint

MyPaint is a free and open-source raster graphics editor for digital painting. It is available for Linux, macOS, and Windows.

== History ==
MyPaint versions up to 1.00 and bug/issue tracking were hosted by Gna!.

MyPaint uses graphical control elements from GTK and, since 1.2.0, uses GTK 3.

In 2020 MyPaint 2.0.0 release succeeds MyPaint 1.2, released back in 2017, and brings a stack of new features and improved tools with it.

== Features ==
Among MyPaint's capabilities are:

- Pressure-sensitive graphics tablet support
- Dynamic brush library, standalone for integration into third-party applications
- Layer management
- Simple interface
- Gamut masking color wheel
- "Unlimited" canvas not requiring predetermination of image size
- Symmetry Modes
- Python 3 support
- Integrated bug reporting
- Supports graphics tablets made by Wacom, and similar devices

== libmypaint ==
libmypaint
- Original author: Martin Renold
- Developer: libmypaint Contributors
- Release: November 23, 2008; 17 years ago
- Stable release: 1.6.1 / May 12, 2020; 6 years ago
- Written in: C
- Operating system: Linux, macOS, Windows
- Type: Brush library
- License: ISC
- Website: mypaint.org
- Repository: github.com/mypaint/libmypaint

MyPaint has a custom procedural brush engine optimized for use with pressure-sensitive graphics tablets. In later MyPaint versions, the engine was broken out into the separately maintained libmypaint library to make it easier to integrate into other applications.

MyPaint's brush library is available as a Krita plugin, and also GIMP has support for MyPaint brushes by default.

== Media attention ==
MyPaint was used by David Revoy, the art director of Sintel (the third computer-animated film by the Blender Foundation).

== Native file format ==
The Adobe PSD file format changed its license in 2006, and it is now only permitted to develop applications using it in order to interact with Adobe software. As a result, a comprehensive graphics design format, OpenRaster, was developed based on the Open Document format. MyPaint uses Open Raster as its default format, but also supports saving images to PNG or JPEG.
