= Mayun =

Mayun may refer to:

- Mayian, the preparation ceremony one day before a Punjabi wedding
- Mayun Island, a volcanic island in the Strait of Mandeb at the south entrance into the Red Sea
- Jack Ma (Chinese: 马云, pinyin: Mǎ Yún), co-founder and former executive chairman of Alibaba Group
- Gitee (Chinese: 码云, pinyin: Mǎyún), a source code hosting platform.
