= Launchpad (website) =

Web application for maintaining software

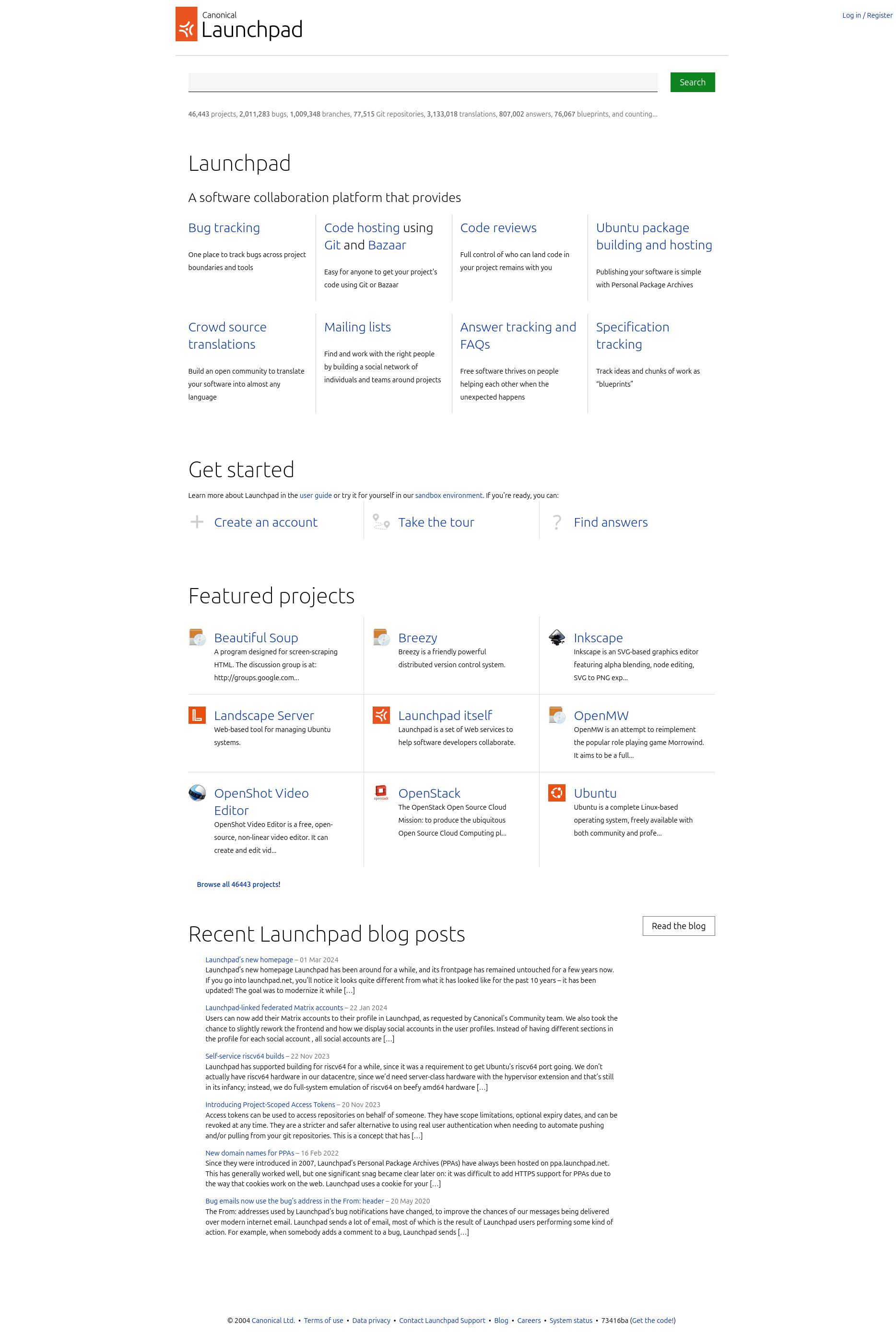
- Website type: Forge
- Available in: English
- Owner: Canonical Ltd.
- Creator: Canonical Ltd.
- Website: launchpad.net
- Commercial: Yes
- Registration: Optional
- Launched: January 2004; 22 years ago
- Current status: Active
- Content license: GNU Affero General Public License
- Written in: Python

Launchpad Suite
- Developers: Francis J. Lacoste and 52 others
- Release: 15 June 2005; 21 years ago
- Written in: Python
- Available in: English
- Type: Project management
- License: GNU Affero General Public License
- Website: launchpad.net/launchpad-project
- Repository: code.launchpad.net/launchpad

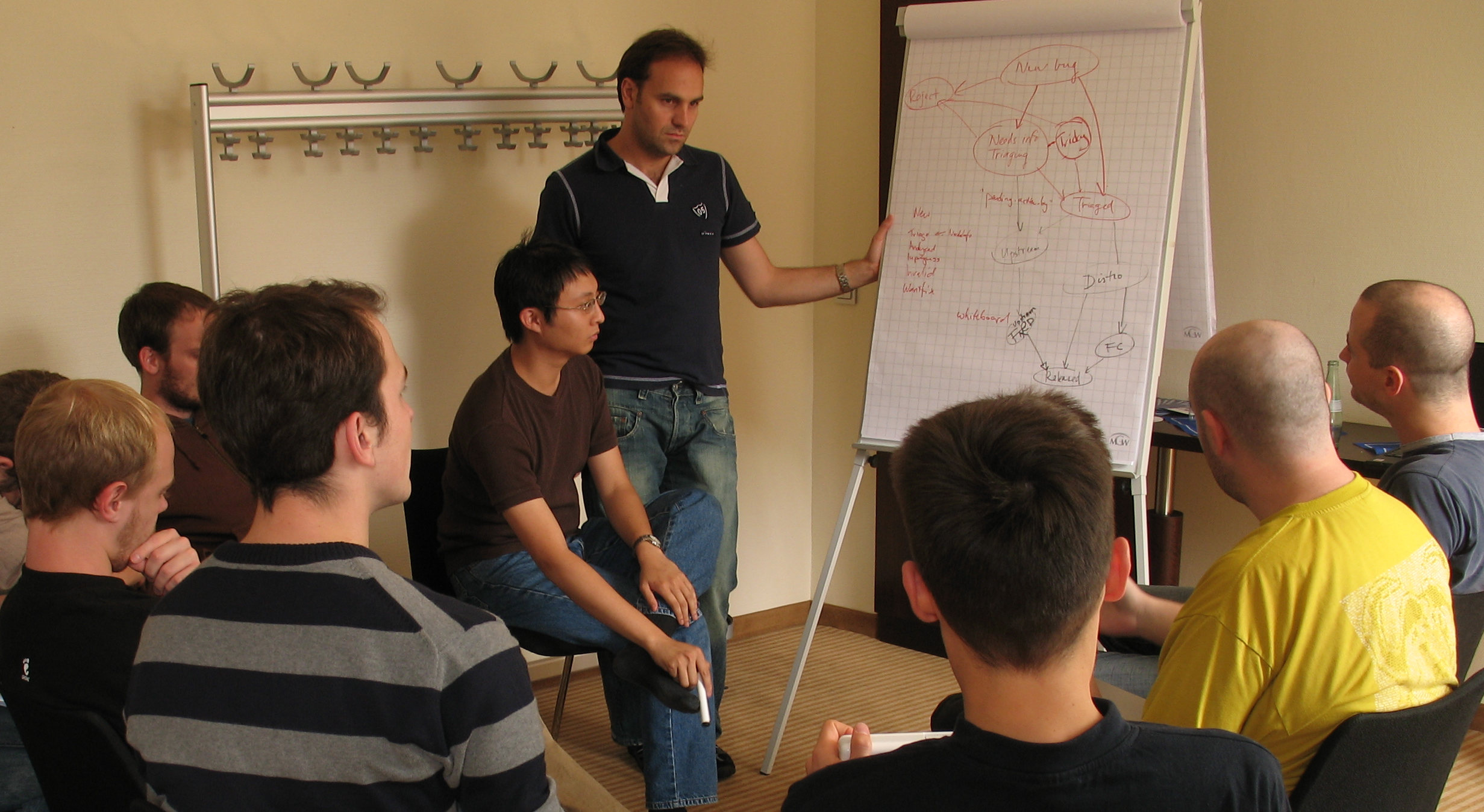
Mark Shuttleworth with other Canonical Ltd. employees discussing Launchpad at a design sprint in Germany

Launchpad is a web application and website that allows users to develop and maintain software, particularly open-source software. It is developed and maintained by Canonical Ltd.

On 21 July 2009, the source code was released publicly under the GNU Affero General Public License. As of June 2018, the Launchpad repository hosts more than 40,000 projects. The domain launchpad.net attracted 1 million visitors by August 2009 according to a Compete.com survey.

== Components ==
It has several parts:

- Answers: a community support site and knowledge base.
- Blueprints: a system for tracking new features.
- Bugs: a bug tracker that allows bugs to be tracked in multiple contexts (e.g. in an Ubuntu package, as an upstream, or in remote bug trackers).
- Code: source code hosting, with support for the Bazaar and Git version control systems.
- Translations: a site for localising applications into different languages.

A significant but less visible component is Soyuz, "the distribution management portion of Launchpad." Launchpad is currently primarily used in the development of Ubuntu, an operating system. Launchpad uses the FOSS (free/open source) Zope 3 application server.

== Users ==
Several of Canonical Ltd.'s own projects use Launchpad for development including Ubuntu and Bazaar. Development of Launchpad is itself managed in Launchpad.

Other prominent projects using Launchpad for various aspects of managing their development include:

- JOSM (translations)
- Linux Mint (translations)
- MariaDB (mailing list)
- OpenStack (bug tracking)
- Pinta (bug tracking and translations)
- Upstart
- elementary OS

== Transition to free software ==
Launchpad was initially criticized by the Jem Report and other members of the free software community for not being available under a free license, such as the GNU GPL, despite its aims. In response, the developers stated that they aimed to eventually release it under a free software license, but that it could potentially take years. On 9 July 2007, Canonical Ltd. released Storm, the first Launchpad component made available under a free software license.

Founder Mark Shuttleworth's responded to this criticism saying "we are all actively working on making Launchpad open source" adding that the funding the salaries of Launchpad's developers to be higher priority, and claiming immediate release would result multiple unfederated instances of Launchpad. However, this still left some members of the open-source movement dissatisfied. On 22 July 2008, Mark Shuttleworth announced at OSCON that the complete source code would be released within the next twelve months.

On 19 December 2008, Canonical Ltd. released the Launchpad component "lazr.config" and "lazr.delegates" under version 3 of the GNU LGPL.

An open API is currently in beta testing, which will allow programs to interact with the website. Calls for an open API to be released were aided by projects like Leonov that resorted to screen scraping to get data from Launchpad.

In December 2008, Canonical announced that the source code to the Launchpad website would be released under a free software license by 21 July 2009. It was also announced that two large components of Launchpad, Soyuz (which is responsible for the build system, package management and Ubuntu package publishing) and Codehosting, would not be released under a free software license. Later, the specific date was changed to a more general timeframe of July/August 2009. However, on 21 July 2009, the software was released under the AGPLv3 (a fully free license specifically for web services), including the two components (Codehosting and Soyuz) that were initially planned to remain proprietary.

== See also ==
- Comparison of open source software hosting facilities
- Personal Package Archive (PPA)
