= Gitorious =

- Website type: collaborative code forge
- Available in: English
- Dissolved: June 2015
- Successor: GitLab
- Website: gitorious.org
- Registration: Optional
- Launched: January 2008
- Current status: Offline

Gitorious
- Developers: GitLab, Powow AS, Gitorious AS
- Final release: 3.2 / December 4, 2014; 11 years ago
- Written in: Ruby
- Operating system: Linux
- Available in: English
- Type: Project management software
- License: GNU Affero General Public License 3
- Website: gitorious.org
- Repository: github.com/gitorious (GitHub mirror)

Gitorious was an online service for hosting collaborative free and open-source software projects developed using Git for revision control. Although the source code powering it was itself freely available to be downloaded and installed and remains so, it was written primarily to be the basis for the website at gitorious.org, until the acquisition of Gitorious by GitLab in 2015.

According to the Git User's Survey, Gitorious was the second most popular hosting service for Git in 2011, with 11.7% of respondents indicating they used it, behind 87.5% using GitHub. On 3 March 2015, Gitorious was acquired by GitLab, who announced service through gitorious.org would be discontinued on 1 June 2015 and encouraged Gitorious users to make use of its import tools to migrate projects to GitLab.

== Features and constraints ==
In addition to source code hosting, Gitorious provided projects with wikis, a web interface for merge requests and code reviews, and activity timelines for projects and developers.

According to the terms of service, if bandwidth usage for an account, project or repository exceeded 500 MB/month, or significantly exceeds the average bandwidth usage of other Gitorious.org users or customers, Gitorious.org reserved the right to immediately disable or throttle the account, project or repository until the account owner can reduce the bandwidth consumption.

Gitorious AS released the Gitorious software under the AGPLv3 as free software.

== Acquisitions ==
In August 2013, Gitorious AS was acquired by Powow AS, a Norwegian-Polish consulting company.

Gitorious was then acquired by GitLab as of 3 March 2015. GitLab kept gitorious.org online through May 2015 and added an automatic migration function for project to move to GitLab.com which offers both paid and free hosting services and maintains an open source "community" edition for self-hosting.

At the time of the GitLab acquisition, there were four Powow employees behind Gitorious. GitLab CEO Sytse Sijbrandij, responding to comments about the acquisition on Hacker News, wrote that "[Powow] wanted to shut the company down without a bankruptcy". So, GitLab, as a way to bolster their user base, bought Gitorious even though they were not hiring the employees or using the Gitorious software. In addition to providing optional migration to GitLab.com, GitLab opened discussions with Archive.org about preserving the Gitorious repositories for historical reference. As of mid-2016, as a result of efforts by GitLab, ex-Gitorious staff, and Archive Team, Gitorious.org existed as a read-only mirror of its former self, containing some 120,000 repositories comprising 5TB of data.

== See also ==
- Comparison of open source software hosting facilities
