= Google Summer of Code =

Annual open source software coding program

Google Summer of Code GSoC
- Google Summer of Code Logo
- Status: Active
- Begins: April – May
- Ends: October
- Frequency: Annually
- Country: Worldwide
- Years active: 20 (2005 – present)
- Inaugurated: 2005
- Founder: Sergey Brin; Larry Page
- Participants: Anyone aged 18 or over
- Website: summerofcode.withgoogle.com

The Google Summer of Code, often abbreviated as GSoC, is an international annual program in which Google awards stipends to contributors who successfully complete a free and open-source software coding project during the summer. As of 2022, the program is open to anyone aged 18 or over, no longer just students and recent graduates. It was first held from May to August 2005. Participants get paid to write software, with the amount of their stipend depending on the purchasing power parity of the country where they are located. Project ideas are listed by host organizations involved in open-source software development, though students can also propose their own project ideas.

The idea for the Summer of Code came directly from Google's founders, Sergey Brin and Larry Page. From 2007 until 2009 Leslie Hawthorn, who has been involved in the project since 2006, was the program manager. From 2010 until 2015, Carol Smith was the program manager. In 2016, Stephanie Taylor took over management of the program.

== Overview ==
Each year, the program follows a timeline. First, open-source organizations apply to participate. If accepted, each organization provides a list of initial project ideas and invites contributors to their development communities. Contributors who meet the eligibility criteria then submit up to 3 proposals that detail the software-coding projects that interest them. These applications are then evaluated by the corresponding mentoring organization, with mentors and organizational administrators reviewing the applications and deciding how many "slots" to request from Google, and which proposals to accept. Google allocates slots to each organization, taking into account organizational capacity, mentoring history, and the number of applications the organization has received. Finally, organizations select the top proposals to fill their slots and Google verifies eligibility before announcing accepted contributors. In the event of a single contributor being selected by more than one organization, the organization which allocates a slot to the student first is given priority.

== History ==
=== 2005 ===
In 2005, more than 8,740 project proposals were submitted for the 200 available student positions. Due to the overwhelming response, Google expanded the program to 419 positions.

The mentoring organizations were responsible for reviewing and selecting proposals, and then providing guidance to those students to help them complete their proposal. Students that successfully completed their proposal to the satisfaction of their mentoring organization were awarded $4500 and a Google Summer of Code T-shirt, while $500 per project was sent to the mentoring organization. Approximately 80% of the projects were successfully completed in 2005, although completion rates varied by organization: Ubuntu, for example, reported a completion rate of only 64%, and KDE reported a 67% completion rate. Many projects were continued past summer, even though the SOC period was over, and some changed direction as they developed.

For the first Summer of Code, Google was criticized for not giving sufficient time to open source organizations so they could plan projects for the Summer of Code. Despite these criticisms there were 41 organizations involved, including FreeBSD, Apache, KDE, Ubuntu, Blender, Mozdev, and Google itself.

According to a blog post by Chris DiBona, Google's open source program manager, "something like 30 percent of the students stuck with their groups past SoC [Summer of Code]." Mozilla developer Gervase Markham also commented that none of the 10 Google-sponsored Mozilla projects survived after the event. However, the Gaim (now Pidgin) project was able to enlist enough coding support through the event to include the changes into Gaim (now Pidgin) 2.0; the Jabber Software Foundation (now XMPP Standards Foundation) and KDE project also counted a few surviving projects of their own from the event (KDE only counted 1 continuing project from out of the 24 projects which it sponsored).

=== 2006 ===
In 2006, around 6,000 applications were submitted, less than the previous year because all applicants were required to have Google Accounts which reduced the number of spam applications received. Google and most mentors found that the proposals were of much higher quality than 2005's applications. Also, the number of participating organizations more than doubled to 102. In addition to the organizations that participated in 2005, organizations such as Debian, GNU, Gentoo, Adium, PHP, and ReactOS participated in 2006. Google had decided to sponsor around 600 projects.

The student application deadline was extended until 2006-05-09, at 11:00 PDT. Although the results were to be declared by 5:00 PM PDT, there was considerable delay in publishing it as Google had not expected several students to be selected in more than one organization. Google allows one student to undertake only one project as part of the program. It took Google several hours to resolve the duplicate acceptances. The acceptance letters were sent out on May 24, at 3:13 AM PDT, but the letters were also sent out to some 1,600 applicants who had in fact, not been accepted by Google's SoC committee. At 3:38 AM PDT, Chris DiBona posted an apology to the official mailing list, adding that "We're very deeply sorry for this. If you received two e-mails, one that said you were accepted and one that you were not, this means you were not."

Google has released a final list of projects accepted into the program on the SoC website. The proposals themselves were visible to the public for a few hours, after which they were taken down in response to complaints by the participants about the "sensitive and private" information that their applications contained. However, Google has since resolved these issues by allowing each student involved in Summer of Code to provide a brief abstract message that is publicly viewable and completely separate from the content of the actual proposal that was submitted to Google.

The Summer of Code 2006 ended on 2006-09-08. According to Google, 82% of the students received a positive evaluation at the end of the program.

=== 2007 ===
In 2007, Google accepted 131 organizations and over 900 students. Those 131 organizations had a total of nearly 1500 mentors.

Students were allowed to submit up to 20 applications although only one could be accepted. Google received nearly 6,200 applications.

To allow more students to apply, Google extended the application deadline from March 24 to March 26 at the last minute. It was then extended again to March 27.

On April 11, the acceptance letters were delayed due to additional efforts involved in resolving duplicate submissions. At one point, the web interface changed each application to have a status of Not Selected. Google officials reported that only the acceptance email was the definitive indication of acceptance.

=== 2008 ===
In 2008, Google chose 174 open source organizations to participate in Summer of Code, greatly increased from 131 the year before and 102 in 2006. Each organization was chosen based on a number of criteria, such as the virtue of the projects, the ideas given for students to work on, and the ability of the mentors to ensure students successfully completed projects. Nearly 7100 proposals were received for the 2008 Summer of Code, of which 1125 were selected.

The university results were announced on May 8, 2008 at Google's "Open Source at Google" blog. According to it, University of Moratuwa came first in both "Top 10 Universities of 2008 GSoC applicants" and "Top 10 accepted universities 2008 GSoC" categories. Wrocław University of Technology able to secure the second place in "2008 GSoC Accepted: Top 10 Universities" category, while Universidade Estadual de Campinas became second in "2008 GSoC Applicants: Top 10 Universities" category.

=== 2009 ===
For 2009 Google reduced the number of software projects to 150, and capped the number of student projects it would accept at 1,000, 85 percent of which were successfully completed.

As of 2009, University of Moratuwa in Sri Lanka ranks first in terms of the number of awards received by students for the five-year period 2005–2009 securing 79 accepted students.

=== 2010 ===
In 2010 Google accepted 150 software projects and 1,026 students from 69 countries worldwide. The top ten countries by number of students accepted in 2010 are: United States (197), India (125), Germany (57), Brazil (50), Poland (46), Canada (40), China (39), United Kingdom (36), France (35), Sri Lanka (34).

=== 2011 ===
The number of organizations was increased to 175, of which 50 were new. 1,115 students were accepted.

A total of 595 different universities participated in the program, 160 of which were new to the program. The 13 universities with the highest number of students accepted into the 2011 Google Summer of Code account for 14.5% of the students.

University of Moratuwa, Sri Lanka secured first position in 2011's program with 27 accepted students. Polytechnic University of Bucharest, Romania was the second with 23 accepted students while Indian Institute of Technology, Kharagpur, India placed third with 14 students.

The breakdown of college degrees for the 2011 Google Summer of Code program was as follows: 55% of the students were undergraduates, 23.3% were pursuing their master's degrees, 10.2% were working on their PhDs and 11.5% did not specify which degree they were working toward.

=== 2012 ===
Google announced the Google Summer of Code 2012 on February 4, 2012. On April 23, 2012, Google announced that 1,212 proposals were accepted in 180 organizations. For the first time since inception, the highest number of GSoC participants came from India (227) followed by the USA (173) and Germany (72). The University of Moratuwa continued its dominance with 29 selections, followed by Dhirubhai Ambani Institute of Information and Communication Technology leading from India at 3rd rank. For the first time, Mauritius, an African country, participated in the Google Summer of Code.

=== 2013 ===
Google announced the Google Summer of Code 2013 on February 11, 2013. On April 8, 2013, Google announced that 177 open source projects and organizations would take part that year. 1,192 student project proposals were accepted. This was the first time that Cameroon was represented in the program by 2 students.

=== 2014 ===
Google announced the Google Summer of Code 2014 on February 3, 2014. On April 21, 2014, Google announced that 190 open source projects and organizations would take part that year. 1,307 student project proposals were accepted. The 2014 edition was the first time for students from Ethiopia, Honduras, Kenya, Malawi and Uganda have been accepted to this program. Kenya and Cameroon taking the lead with 3 students and the other countries with one student.

=== 2015 ===
Google announced the Google Summer of Code 2015 on February 9, 2015. On March 2, 2015, Google announced that 137 open source projects and organizations would take part that year, some notable exceptions including Mozilla, the Linux Foundation, and the Tor Project. The student application period began on March 16, 2015. The accepted student proposals were announced on April 27, 2015, with 1051 student proposals accepted. The highest number of GSoC participants came from India (335) followed by the USA (127) and Sri Lanka (58).

=== 2016 ===
Google announced the Google Summer of Code 2016 on February 9, 2016. The deadline for organization application was set to February 19, 2016. The student application period began on March 14, 2016, and student application deadline was set to March 25, 2016. 180 organizations were accepted. It saw 18,981 total registered students (up 36% from 2015) with 7,543 student proposals from 5,107 students in 142 countries. The accepted student proposals were announced on April 22, 2016, with 1,206 student proposals accepted.

=== 2017 ===
The number of organizations was increased to 201, of which 39 were new.

The 1,318 students accepted into the program hailed from 575 universities, of which 142 have students participating for the first time.

Over 20,651 students from 144 countries registered for the program, which is an 8.8% increase over the previous high for the program.

4,764 students from 108 countries submitted a total of 7,089 project proposals.

=== 2018 ===
Google Summer of Code 2018 followed the general structure of earlier editions, with mentoring organizations announced in February, student applications in March, accepted student projects announced in May, a summer coding period, and final results released in August, accompanied by detailed statistical reports on participation.

Announcement and organizations

Google announced in September 2017 that it would run Google Summer of Code 2018 and invited open source projects to apply as mentoring organizations. A call for organization applications was issued in January 2018. Google announced the list of accepted mentoring organizations on 12 February 2018. For the 2018 edition, 212 organizations were accepted, of which 41 were participating for the first time. Students ultimately worked with 206 organizations during the coding period, the highest number of active organizations in the program up to that time.

Application timeline and student selection

The student application period for Google Summer of Code 2018 opened on 12 March 2018 at 16:00 UTC and closed on 27 March 2018 at 16:00 UTC. A total of 25,873 students from 147 countries registered for the program, representing a 25.3 percent increase over the previous high recorded in 2017. Of these, 5,199 students from 101 countries submitted 7,209 project proposals. Google announced the list of accepted students on 9 May 2018. In total, 1,268 students from 613 universities were accepted to work with 206 organizations. Of the accepted students, 88.2 percent were participating in Google Summer of Code for the first time, and 74.4 percent were first-time applicants.

Countries and participant distribution

Accepted students in 2018 came from 62 countries, including first-time participation by students from Kosovo and Senegal. The largest numbers of accepted students were from India (605), the United States (104), Germany (53), China (52), and Sri Lanka (41). Three students were accepted from Kosovo and one from Senegal. Google reported that 11.63 percent of accepted students identified as women.

Universities and academic background

The accepted students represented 613 universities worldwide, 216 of which were participating in Google Summer of Code for the first time. Universities with the highest numbers of accepted students included the Indian Institute of Technology Roorkee (35 students), the International Institute of Information Technology, Hyderabad (32), and BITS Pilani (23).

Approximately 76.18 percent of accepted students were undergraduates, 17.5 percent were master’s students, and 6.3 percent were doctoral students. By field of study, about 73 percent of students were majoring in computer science, 4.2 percent in mathematics, and around 17 percent in other engineering disciplines, with the remainder in other fields.

Program completion and outcomes

Following a community bonding period, the 2018 coding phase began in mid-May and ran for 12 weeks. On 22 August 2018, Google reported that 1,072 students from 59 countries had successfully completed the program, working with 212 organizations and more than 2,100 mentors.

=== 2019 ===
207 organizations were accepted in 2019.

=== 2020 ===
199 organizations and 1199 student projects were accepted in 2020.

=== 2021 ===
202 organizations and 1292 student projects were accepted in 2021.

=== 2022 ===
Google announced a massive expansion to the Google Summer of Code program in November 2021. The updated program allowed anyone over 18 to participate, which significantly broadened the scope of the program which used to just focus on students and new graduates. Google also rolled out both medium and large projects to give open source organizations flexibility to tackle more complex projects.

== See also ==
- Outreachy
