= OSDN =

Web-hosted software development forge service including source code repository management

- Website type: Collaborative development environment
- Owner: OSChina
- Creator: VA Linux Systems Japan K.K.
- Website: osdn.net
- Commercial: Yes
- Registration: Optional
- Launched: April 18, 2002; 24 years ago
- Current status: Defunct

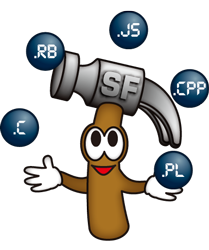
SourceForge.JP Official Character

OSDN (formerly SourceForge.JP) was a web-based collaborative development environment for open-source software projects. It provided source code repositories and web hosting services. With features similar to SourceForge, it acted as a centralized location for open-source software developers.

The OSDN repository hosted more than 5,000 projects and more than 50,000 registered users. Registered software used to be mostly specialized for Japanese use, such as input method systems, fonts, and so on, but also included applications like Cabos, TeraTerm, and Shiira. Also, since the renewal of the brand name to OSDN, some projects that used to be developed on SourceForge moved to OSDN, such as MinGW, TortoiseSVN, Android-x86, and Clonezilla.

== History ==
SourceForge.JP was started by VA Linux Systems (latterly SourceForge, Inc.) and its subsidiary VA Linux Systems Japan on April 18, 2002. OSDN K.K. spun off from VA Linux Systems Japan in August 2007. As of June 2009, OSDN K.K. was operating SourceForge.JP.

On May 11, 2015, the site was renamed from "SourceForge.JP" to "OSDN". In the same month that OSDN changed the site name, SourceForge caused two controversies: DevShare adware and project hijacking. In contrast, OSDN refuses adware bundling and project hijacking. For that reason, the changing of the site name to OSDN is perceived to have been done based on criticism of and adverse reactions to SourceForge's monetization.

On February 26, 2020, it was announced on the site that OSDN was being transferred to Appirits, Inc., a Japanese software company.

Open Source China (OSChina) announced on 24 July 2023 that it had acquired OSDN in 2022. The site had reliability problems almost immediately after this announcement, and there was an effort by SourceForge (the original, American-based site) to recruit projects that might choose to leave OSDN, especially those using SVN, which would be unsupported on GitHub. Many projects left OSDN, including Vim and TeraTerm.

ITmedia NEWS reported on January 22, 2024, that OSDN had announced they would shut down the associated Slashdot Japan-successor site (Surado) at the end of January 2024. However, articles in ITmedia NEWS and Surado at the end of January reported that the closure of both sites had been cancelled, and OSChina now hoped to keep them in operation while seeking acquirers to take them over. Nonetheless, in March 2025, Surado (formerly Slashdot Japan) announced that OSDN had decided to close OSDN along with Surado at the end of March. On April 9, 2025, the OSDN.net website is no longer reachable to the public.

== Features ==
OSDN provided revision control systems such as CVS, SVN, Git, Mercurial, and every feature in SourceForge. What made OSDN different from SourceForge was the bug tracking system and the wiki system. On OSDN, these were very Trac-like systems.

== See also ==
- Comparison of source code hosting facilities
