= Gitea =

Free forge based on Git written in Go

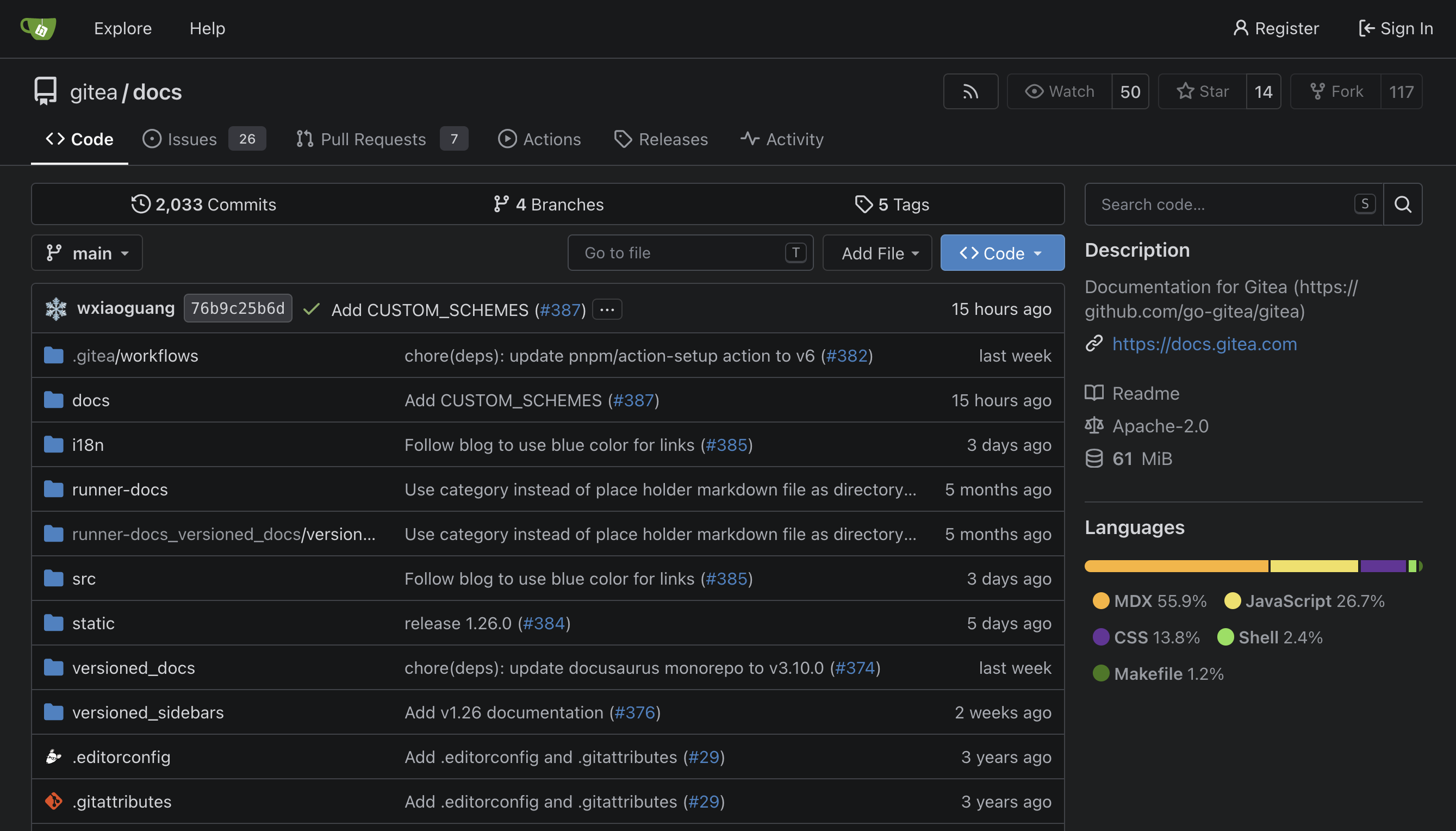
- A screenshot of a Gitea repository
- Release: 17 October 2016
- Stable release: 28.2.0 / 18 October 2026; 13 days ago
- Written in: Go, TypeScript
- Operating system: Cross-platform
- Platform: x86-64, ARM, RISC-V
- Type: Collaborative version control (forge)
- License: MIT License
- Website: https://about.gitea.com/
- Repository: https://gitea.com/gitea

Gitea (/ɡɪˈtiː/) is a forge software package for hosting software development version control using Git as well as other collaborative features like bug tracking, code review, continuous integration, kanban boards, tickets, and wikis. It supports self-hosting and also provides a free public first-party instance. It is a fork of Gogs and is written in Go and TypeScript. Gitea can be hosted on all platforms supported by Go including FreeBSD, Linux, macOS, OpenBSD, and Windows. The project is funded on Open Collective.

== History ==
Gitea is an open-source Git service that originated as a fork of Gogs in 2016. While Gogs was open-source, its repository was controlled by a single maintainer. In response to these limitations, the Gitea developers decided to fork Gogs in November 2016, creating a community-driven development model. Gitea had its official 1.0 release in December 2016.

In October 2022, maintainers Lunny Xiao and Matti Ranta founded the company Gitea Limited with the goal of offering hosting services using specialized closed-source Open-core model versions of Gitea, splitting the supported variants of Gitea between the Gitea Limited-provided installation and the original version licensed under the MIT License. In response, Codeberg, one of the major forges using Gitea at the time, forked Gitea to Forgejo.

== See also ==
- Comparison of source-code-hosting facilities
- Version control
- GitLab
- Bitbucket
- Gitee
