= GNU Savannah =

Software forge, website, and associated engine

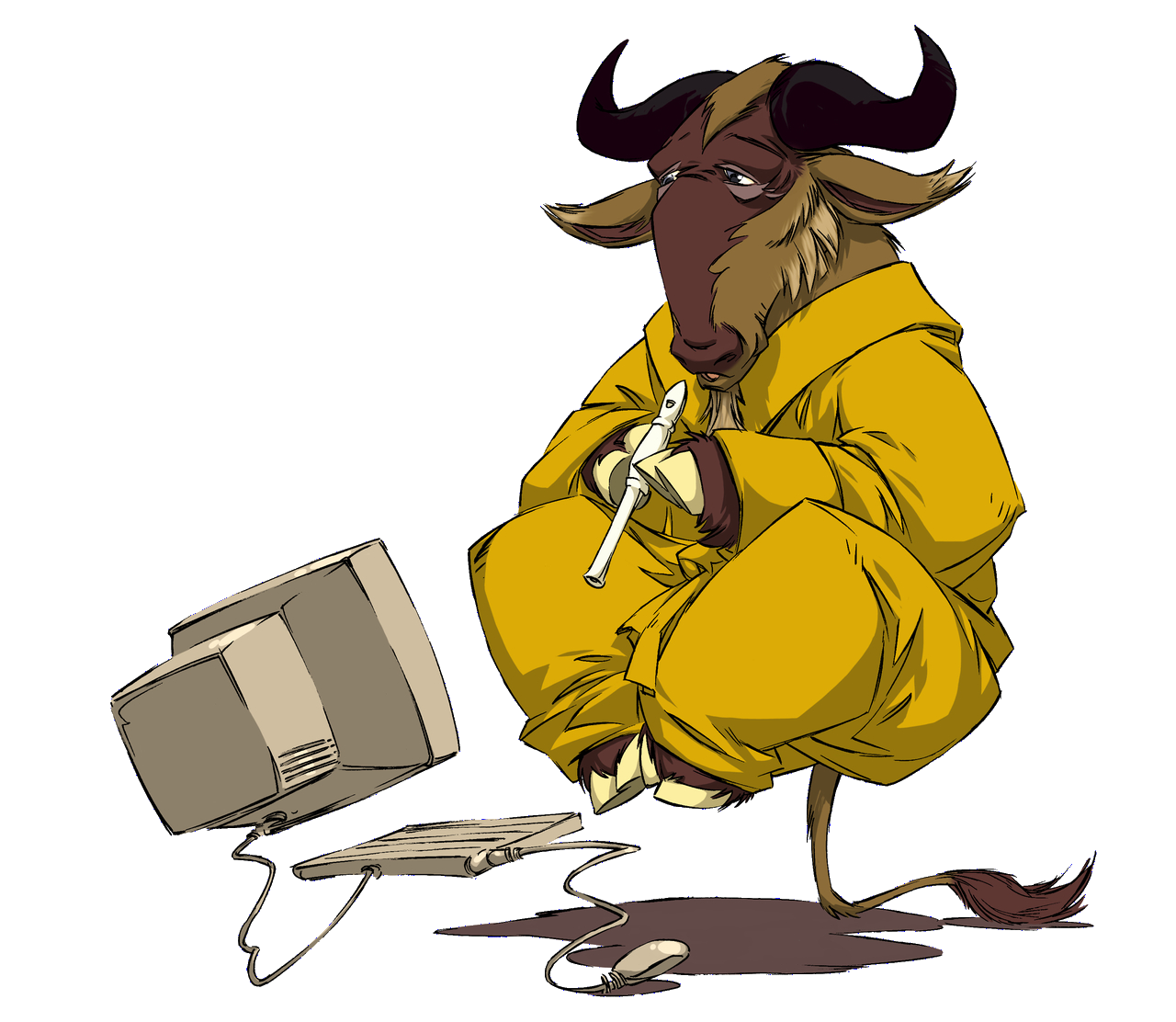
- The levitating, meditating, flute-playing gnu logo used by GNU Savannah
- Website type: Forge
- Area served: Worldwide
- Owner: Free Software Foundation
- Website: savannah.gnu.org
- Advertising: No
- Commercial: No
- Registration: Optional
- Current status: Active
- Written in: PHP

GNU Savannah is a project of the Free Software Foundation initiated by Loïc Dachary, which serves as a collaborative software development management system for free software projects. Savannah currently offers CVS, GNU arch, Subversion, Git, Mercurial, Bazaar, mailing list, web hosting, file hosting, and bug tracking services. Savannah initially ran on the same SourceForge software that at the time was used to run the SourceForge portal.

Savannah's website is split into two domain names: savannah.gnu.org for software that is officially part of the GNU Project, and savannah.nongnu.org for all other software.

Unlike SourceForge or GitHub, Savannah's focus is for hosting free software projects and has very strict hosting policies, including a ban against the use of non-free formats (such as Adobe Flash) to ensure that only free software is hosted. When registering a project, project submitters have to state which free software license the project uses.

Project owners do not have the freedom of deleting their submitted projects on their own wish and the staff has a policy of refusing all deletion requests, unless the project was approved by mistake or has always been empty.

== History ==
Loïc Dachary installed SourceForge on a server located in Boston for the benefit of the GNU Project (specifically, to power the GNU Savannah's website). When, as contributor to SourceForge, he found out it was to be turned into proprietary software, he forked it and named it Savannah (since it was the software running the GNU Project's Savannah website and had no other name). People contributing to GNU Savannah were called savannah-hackers from this day, as it was at first more a quick hack than anything else.

CERN took interest in the source code and hired Mathieu Roy, a savannah-hacker, to work in Geneva. It led to the development of Savane (software) starting in 2003.

In 2003, Vincent Caron, friend to Loïc Dachary, found out the security of the server located was compromised. A new server was bought by the Free Software Foundation to provide a clean reinstall of the software. When this server was put in place, after a four-month outage without any public news, only Free Software Foundation employees had access to it. Notably savannah-hackers had no access and found out that Richard M. Stallman decided to move GNU Savannah to GForge because it was "seriously maintained". In response, Vincent Caron, Loïc Dachary and Mathieu Roy put up an alternative instance of the software called Gna!, with a specific constitution inspired by the Debian Social Contract designed to prevent any unexpected take over.

GNU Savannah was totally or partly offline for months and, ultimately, did not move to GForge, which itself turned into proprietary software.

== See also ==
- Savane (software) — the software running GNU Savannah
- Puszcza — a sister software development hosting site of GNU Savannah maintained by long-time GNU volunteer Sergey Poznyakoff in Ukraine
- Gna! — a sister software development hosting site of GNU Savannah, by Free Software Foundation France (now deactivated)
- Comparison of source-code-hosting facilities
- FusionForge — the continuity of the original opensource GForge
- GForge — another fork of SourceForge, now proprietary
- SourceForge — software used by GNU Savannah before fork
- Apache Allura — the continuation of the original SourceForge software
