= Agilo for Trac =

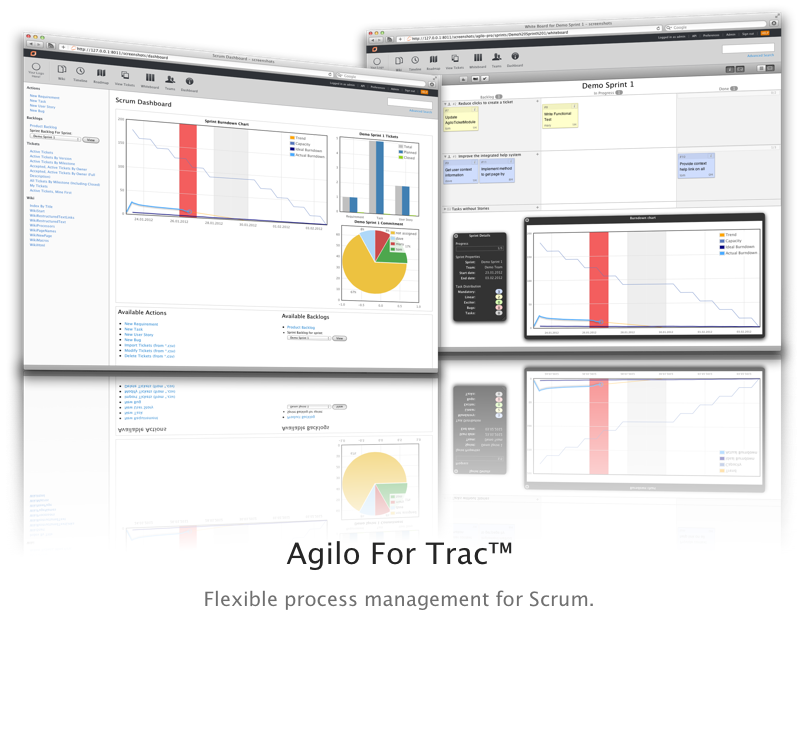
- Initial release: 2007; 18 years ago
- Stable release: 1.3.15 / June 28, 2016; 9 years ago
- Written in: Python JavaScript
- Operating system: Cross-platform
- Available in: English
- Type: Agile Project Management
- License: Apache Software License
- Website: www.agilofortrac.com

Agilo for Trac (formally known as Agilo for Scrum) is an open source, web-based Scrum tool to support the agile Scrum software development process. Agilo is based on Trac, a widely used Issue tracking system. It is programmed in Python and is distributed under the Apache Software License 2.0.

Its development was started in January 2007 by Andrea Tomasini while at agile42, and the first public version was released in January 2008. Since August 2011 it has been named to Agilo for Trac to emphasize its binding with Trac.

Agilo is used in agile software development projects in all economic sectors who use the Scrum framework. The python application can be downloaded and used either as a source tarball, python-egg, SaaS, a VMWare Virtual appliance or a Windows Installer.

Version 0.8 is based on Trac 0.11, later versions on Trac 0.12. Starting from release 0.9.15 (1.3.15 PRO) Agilo for Trac is based on Trac 1.0.11.

Agilo supports Scrum-Teams, ScrumMasters and Product Owners in running and coordinating agile software development projects.

Reported users of Agilo include groups at Volkswagen, AT&T, Siemens, eBuddy, and Oracle Corporation.

== See also ==
- Subversion
