= Apache Allura =

Open-source forge software

- Release: October 2009; 17 years ago
- Stable release: 1.22.0 / October 29, 2026; 5 days ago
- Written in: Python
- Operating system: Linux, Unix
- Type: Collaborative Development Environment
- License: Apache License 2.0
- Website: allura.apache.org
- Repository: Allura Repository

Apache Allura is an open-source forge software for managing source code repositories, bug reports, discussions, wiki pages, blogs and more for any number of individual projects. Allura graduated from incubation with the Apache Software Foundation in March 2013.

== Features ==
Allura can manage any number of projects, including groups of projects known as Neighborhoods, as well as sub-projects under individual projects. Allura also has a modular design to support tools attached to neighborhoods or individual projects. Allura comes packaged with many tools, and additional external and third-party tools can be installed. There are tools to manage version control for source code repositories, ticket tracking, discussions, wiki pages, blogs and more.

Allura can also export project data, as well as import data from a variety of sources, such as Trac, Google Code, GitHub, and, of course, Allura itself.

=== Features common to most tools ===
Most tools support Markdown formatting, threaded comments with integrated and configurable spam prevention, group or individual artifact level subscriptions via email or RSS, and powerful searching using Solr. Additionally, the Markdown syntax supports cross-linking, such that a commit can refer to a specific ticket, a comment on a discussion thread can easily link to a commit, or a wiki page can even link directly to a specific comment in a discussion thread. Allura also has a powerful permissions system that gives fine-grained control over who has access to do what.

=== Version control ===
Allura comes packaged with tools for managing Git and SVN repositories. There is also a tool for managing Mercurial repositories, which is packaged separately for license reasons.

Version control integration includes:

- Browser-based file and commit browsing
- Color-coded unified or side-by-side diff viewing
- Syntax highlighting
- Forking and merge / pull requests
- Commit history graph view

=== Ticket / bug tracking ===
- Multiple trackers per project
- File attachments
- Milestones, labels, and custom fields
- Saved searches for frequent use
- Bulk editing of tickets

=== Threaded discussion forums ===
- Moderation
- Reply-by-email
- Spam prevention

=== Wiki ===
- Attachments
- Syntax highlighting for code snippets
- Browsing pages by name or tags
- Custom macros for things like project listings, blog post listings, and adding a Gittip button

=== Blogs ===
- Pre-publish drafts
- External feed integration
- Optional discussion comments with spam prevention

== History ==
Allura began in October 2009 as an open-source reimplementation in Python of the developer tools for SourceForge (previously written in PHP), and was first announced in March 2011. Allura became the default platform for new projects on SourceForge in July 2011.

In June 2012, Allura was submitted to the Apache Software Foundation (ASF) and began incubation to become an Apache project. Allura was moved to the ASF to encourage community engagement and to ensure an open and community oriented development process. Allura graduated to a top-level Apache project in March 2013.

== Notable installations ==
- Apache Allura
- SourceForge.net
- Open Source Projects Europe
- DLR German Aerospace Center
- DARPA's VehicleForge

== See also ==
- Comparison of project management software
- Bloodhound
- Kallithea
- Trac
