= SEUL =

Simple End User Linux is an advocacy group that promotes Linux programs in education and science. SEUL also hosts numerous free software projects and efforts, such as the WorldForge Project's website. The SEUL/Edu project seeks to further the use of Linux and open-source software in schools and was one of the groups which laid the groundwork for the SchoolForge project. The SEUL/Sci project (now dormant) focused on the use of Linux and Free Software in research.

Other project of note connected to SEUL is Tor (network).

== See also ==
- Comparison of open source software hosting facilities
