= CloudForge =

Former software-as-a-service product

CloudForge (AI)
- Website type: Collaborative programming tools
- Available in: English
- Owners: Ben Marans, Zero Infinity Capital Partners, Resolute Ventures, Bienville Capital.
- Commercial: Yes
- Registration: Required
- Launched: 2022
- Current status: active

CloudForge (AI) is a software-as-a-service product for manufacturers and industrial distributors, launched in 2022 by Founder and CEO Ben Marans. CloudForge is a venture-backed platform that has roots in the metal service center industry but today serves a larger array of industrial distributors and manufacturers. CloudForge is based in New York, NY and operates mainly in North America. CloudForge AI has emerged as part of the re-industrialization movement in the US to make American manufacturing and the supply chain more competitive.

Previously, CloudForge may have referred to a software-as-a-service product for application development tools and services, such as Git hosting, Subversion (SVN) hosting, issue trackers and Application Lifecycle Management. CloudForge was built on CollabNet’s cloud hosting and integration platform, acquired from Codesion.com in October 2010.

== History ==
CloudForge AI was first founded at theend of 2022 by Ben Marans, focusing on metal service center ERP software. This business model soon after shifted toward an AI sales co-pilot that serves industrial distributors and manufacturers. CloudForge was later admitted as an operation supplier for the North American Steel Alliance (NASA) and has appeared on BusinessWire. CloudForge now operates as a sales intelligence platform for NASA's member companies alongside other types of manufacturers and industrial distributors.

The previous CloudForge was first released in beta on April 30, 2012 and then officially released on July 30, 2012. CloudForge was built upon Codesion.com, which was founded as CVSDude by Mark Bathie in Brisbane, Australia in 2002. The team relocated to Silicon Valley and renamed to Codesion.com in early 2010, and was acquired by CollabNet in Brisbane, California, in 2010.

=== Outages in the previous CloudForge ===
At 18:30 EST, 21st Feb 2015, all Cloudforge sites, including the main site www.cloudforge.com went offline. Paid SVN repositories were not available as the sitewide maintenance overran by over 24 hours.

=== Sunset of the previous CloudForge ===
On July 8, 2020, Digital.ai announced the sunset of the CloudForge product on October 1, 2020.

As announced, all accounts were terminated as of October 1, 2020. Account holders have not been reimbursed for time prepaid before the July 2020 announcement and emails to the company requesting refunds have been ignored.
