= List of free software project directories =

The following is a list of notable websites that list free software projects. These directories and repositories of free software differ from software hosting facilities (or software forges) in the number of features they offer and the type of collaboration they are designed to promote.

== General directories ==
Name	Description, focus
SourceForge	largest directory, >500K projects
Apache Software Foundation	Mostly Java
Free Software Directory	About 17000 packages with 386 GNU-packages and 97 High Priority Projects
Open Hub (Formerly Ohloh)	
Libraries.io	Open source libraries, frameworks and tools
ibiblio	Open source software
List of free and open-source software packages	
AlternativeTo	General: can filter by license type "Open Source"
sourcehut	

== Programming language specific directories ==
Name	Description, focus
CPAN	Perl
CTAN	TeX
CRAN	R
Gambas Software Farm	Gambas
JBoss	Enterprise Java
LuaRocks	Lua
PEAR	PHP
Node Package Manager	Node.js
Python Package Index	Python
Hackage	Haskell
RubyGems	Ruby

== See also ==
- Comparison of source-code-hosting facilities
