= Libraries.io =

- Available in: English
- Founder: Andrew Nesbitt
- Industry: Software
- Website: libraries.io
- Registration: Optional
- Launched: March 16, 2015
- Current status: Online
- Written in: Ruby

Libraries.io is an open source web service that lists software development project dependencies and alerts developers to new versions of the software libraries they are using.

Libraries.io is written by Andrew Nesbitt, who has also used the code as the basis for DependencyCI, a service that tests project dependencies. A key feature is that the service checks for software license compliance.

As of 17 April 2022, the web service monitors 6,921,905 open source libraries and supports 32 different package managers. To gather the information on libraries, it uses the dominant package manager for each programming language that is supported. The website organizes them by programming language, package manager, license (such as GPL or MIT), and by keyword.

On November 14, 2017, Libraries.io announced its acquisition by Tidelift, an open-source software support company, with an intention to continue to develop and operate the service.

The code that runs the web service is available on GitHub and under the GNU Affero General Public License.
