= BerliOS =

German website

- Website type: Collaborative revision control and software development management system
- Owner: Fraunhofer Society
- Creator: Jörg Schilling
- Website: www.berlios.de
- Commercial: No
- Registration: Optional (required for creating and joining projects)
- Launched: January 2000; 26 years ago
- Current status: Inactive

BerliOS (short for "Berlin Open Source") is a project founded by the Fraunhofer Institute for Open Communication Systems (FOKUS), Berlin, to coordinate the different interest groups in the field of open source software (OSS) and to assume a neutral coordinator function. The target groups of BerliOS were developers and users of open source software on the one side and OSS-related companies on the other. As of January 1, 2022 its website was still accessible, though hosting no projects.

== Overview ==
BerliOS consisted of several subprojects:

- DocsWell, a database for open source related documentation
- SourceWell, a news service for open source projects
- SourceLines, a "best practice" database for successful open source projects
- SourceBiz, a list of open source companies
- DevCounter, a database of open source developer profiles
- OpenFacts, a wiki-based open source knowledge database (using the MediaWiki software)
- SourceAgency (beta), a platform for coordinating open source funding

== Closure ==
The operators of the BerliOS project announced that BerliOS would close at the end of 2011 due to lack of sufficient funding and support. As the news of the pending closure spread, BerliOS received numerous rescue proposals. As a result, it was later announced that BerliOS would continue as a non-profit institute run by a combination of volunteers, donations and corporate sponsorship.

On February 23, 2012, BerliOS announced on their blog that a cooperation agreement had been signed with SourceForge, which meant that all projects hosted on BerliOS' systems would be automatically mirrored in new and separate projects on SourceForge. On April 4, 2012, SourceForge reiterated this statement on their blog and provided more specifics about the collaboration.

In January 2014 BerliOS announced that they would disable their hosting services on 30 April 2014.

== See also ==
- Comparison of open source software hosting facilities
