= Codeberg =

Open-source software development services organization

Codeberg e.V.
- Formation: September 2018; 8 years ago
- Type: Eingetragener Verein
- Headquarters: Berlin, Germany
- Services: Software forge (Forgejo); Static page hosting (Codeberg Pages); Collaborative translation (Weblate); CI/CD (Woodpecker & Forgejo Actions)
- Members: 1100+
- Expenses: €1050 per month (2022)
- Staff: 2 part-time (2025)
- Website: codeberg.org

Codeberg is a German nonprofit organization that provides online git hosting services.

== Services ==
Codeberg provides an online collaborative software development environment with Forgejo, static page hosting with Codeberg Pages, a collaborative translation web platform with Weblate and CI/CD with Woodpecker CI and Forgejo Actions.

Development of the Gitea-fork Forgejo also takes place on Codeberg.

== History ==
In 2022, the Software Freedom Conservancy started its "Give up GitHub"-campaign, which included Codeberg as one of the suggested alternatives.

As of November 2025, Codeberg hosts over 300,000 repositories and has more than 200,000 registered user accounts and its members had also grown to 1208.

At the end of November 2025, the Zig programming language announced moving to Codeberg as "GitHub no longer demonstrates commitment to engineering excellence." Around the same time, the founder of Dillo announced moving away from GitHub, including setting up a mirror on Codeberg, due to GitHub's "over-focusing on LLMs and generative AI". In February 2026, Gentoo announced its presence on Codeberg, citing GitHub’s attempts to force them to use Copilot as the motivation for the move.

In July 2026, Codeberg amended its terms of service to prohibit users from sharing vibe-coded and cryptocurrencies-related projects.

== See also ==
- Comparison of source-code-hosting facilities
- GitLab
