= GForge =

1999 SourceForge software & derivatives

- Other names: GForge Next; GForgeNext; GForge AS; GForge Advanced Server
- Developer: GForge Group
- Release: June 21, 2006; 20 years ago
- Stable release: 26.3 / October 2, 2026; 32 days ago
- Type: Collaborative development environment
- License: Proprietary
- Website: https://gforge.com

GForge is a commercial service originally based on the Alexandria software behind SourceForge, a web-based project management and collaboration system which was licensed under the GPL. Open source versions of the GForge code were released from 2002 to 2009, at which point the company behind GForge focused on their proprietary service offering which provides project hosting, version control (CVS, Subversion, Git), code reviews, ticketing (issues, support), release management, continuous integration and messaging. The FusionForge project emerged in 2009 to pull together open-source development efforts from the variety of software forks which had sprung up.

GForge Community Edition
- Developer: GForge Group
- Final release: 5.7 / April 23, 2010; 16 years ago
- Written in: PHP
- Operating system: Linux, Unix
- Type: Collaborative development environment
- License: GNU GPL

FusionForge

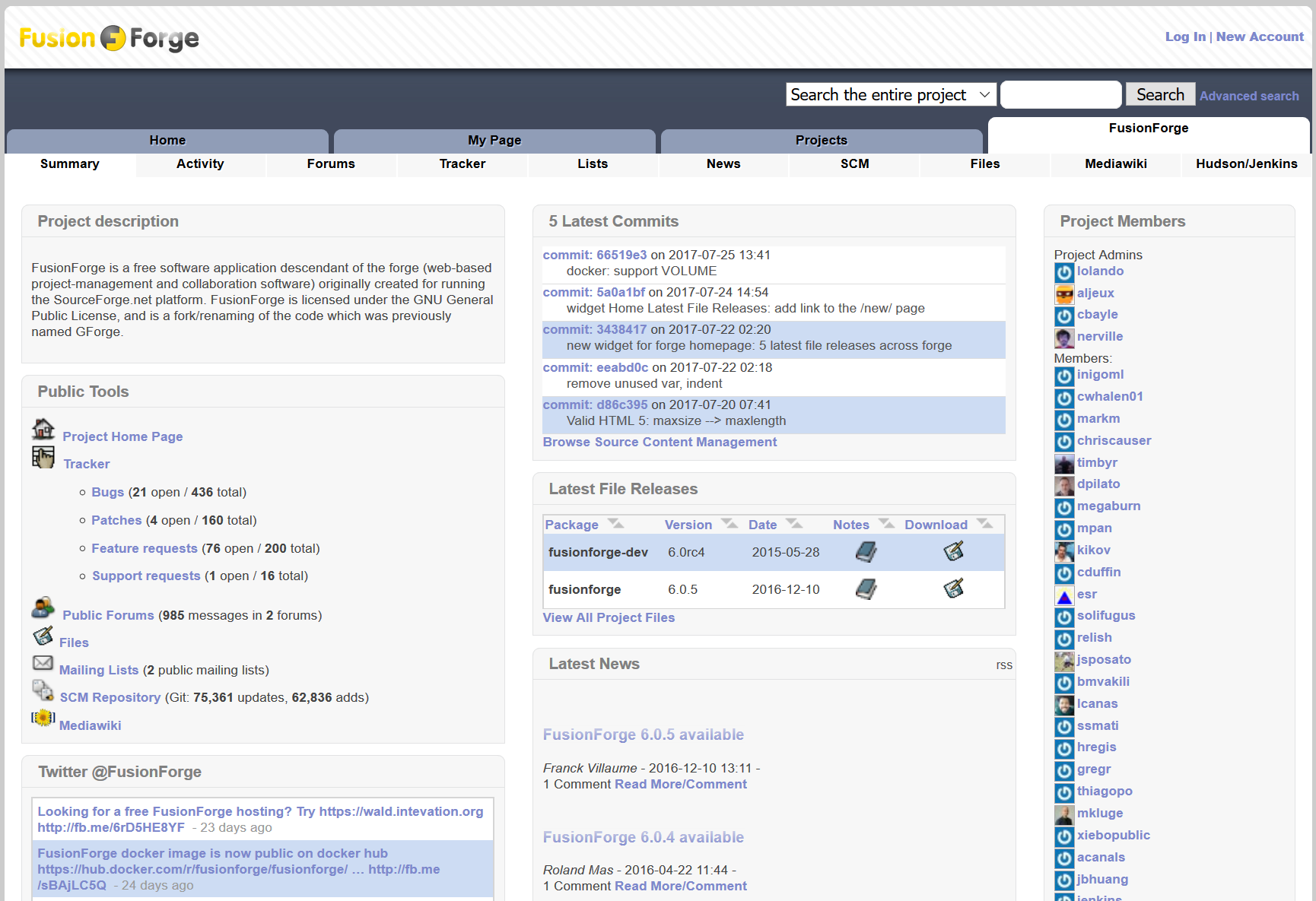
- Screenshot Screenshot of project landing page in 2017
- Stable release: 6.1 / October 5, 2018; 8 years ago
- Written in: PHP
- Operating system: Linux, Unix, Windows, OS X, etc.
- Available in: Multilingual (26 languages including french, english, german, spanish, italian, etc )
- Type: Collaborative Development Environment
- License: GNU GPL2+
- Website: fusionforge.org/projects/fusionforge
- Repository: scm.fusionforge.org/anonscm/gitweb/?p=fusionforge%2Ffusionforge.git

== History ==
In 1999, VA Linux hired four developers, including Tim Perdue (1974-2011), to develop the SourceForge.net service to encourage open-source development and support the Open Source developer community. SourceForge.net services were offered free of charge to any Open Source project team. Following the SourceForge launch on November 17, 1999, the free software community rapidly took advantage of SourceForge.net, and traffic and users grew very quickly.

As another competitive web service, "Server 51", was being readied for launch, VA Linux released the source code for the sourceforge.net web site on January 14, 2000, as a marketing ploy to show that SourceForge was 'more open source'. Many companies began installing and using it themselves and contacting VA Linux for professional services to set up and use the software. However, their pricing was so unrealistic, they had few customers. By 2001, the company's Linux hardware business had collapsed in the dotcom bust. The company was renamed to VA Software and called the closed codebase SourceForge Enterprise Edition to try to force some of the large companies to purchase licenses. This prompted objections from open source community members. VA Software continued to say that a new source code release would be made at some point, but it never was.

Some time later, 2002, Tim Perdue left VA and started GForge LLC which released both an open source and commercial version of GForge. Both codebases were forked from the last publicly released version, 2.6, and merged the debian-sf fork, previously maintained by Roland Mas and Christian Bayle, into the project.

In February 2009 there was a break-up of the original open source (GPL) version of GForge with some of the developers of GForge releasing the continued development of the old open source code under the new name of FusionForge while Perdue and his new company focused on a commercial offering (GForge Advanced Server and later GForgeNext).

== GForge and GForge Advanced Server ==
Tim Perdue and his company begin focusing on a commercial version of GForge originally called GForge Advanced Server (also called GForge AS). It saw first public release on June 21, 2006. While it was offered commercially it could be used freely (with some restrictions on project limits and number of users.). GForge AS was written in PHP and continued to use PostgreSQL. Plug-ins for Eclipse IDE as well as Microsoft Visual Studio (only for customers and with no trial available) and other related tools were added to increase developer functionality. Workflow process management to handle making use of the full software life cycle from inception, bug tracking to new release enhancement citation.

In 2011 GForge came under new ownership under GForge Group, Inc and while work on the GForge AS 6.x series continued the company began working on a partial rewrite dubbed GForgeNext. GForgeNext, later rebranded back to GForge, was released on October 1, 2018, which included a revamped user interface, REST API, support for Agile/Scrum disciplines and the GForge Group, Inc expanded to support SaaS. While not open source, the source is available* and the downloadable version can be used for free for up to five users.

* the source code that does the license enforcement is encrypted.

== FusionForge ==
In 2007, Bull announced the first public release of Novaforge which is based on the GForge open source branch.

In February 2009 some of the developers of GForge continued development of the old open source code under the new name of FusionForge after GForge Group focused on GForge Advanced Server. One objective is to merge GForge forks into a single project, hence the prefix Fusion.

In 2011, FusionForge is selected as part of the Coclico project. It aims to fusion three existing trees of forked forges: FusionForge, Codendi & Novaforge.

End 2013, main Savane maintainer Sylvain Beucler joins FusionForge as INRIA contractor for 2 years. Main contributors to FusionForge include individual contributors such as Roland Mas, small companies such as TrivialDev.

In 2017, FusionForge software is the first forge software to contribute to the Software Heritage initiative, providing a connector to retrieve any information from old FusionForge installations.

== See also ==
- Alioth
- Computer-aided software engineering (CASE)
- Computer-supported collaboration
- GitLab
- GitHub
- GNU Savannah
- Toolkits for User Innovation
