= Bitbucket =

Web-based hosting service for software development projects

- Bitbucket Logo
- Website type: Collaborative version control
- Available in: English, German, Russian, French, Simplified Chinese, Spanish, Hindi, Japanese, Korean, Portuguese
- Owner: Atlassian
- Creator: Jesper Noehr
- Website: bitbucket.org
- Commercial: Yes
- Registration: Required with optional OpenID
- Launched: 2008; 18 years ago
- Current status: Online
- Written in: Python (BitBucket Cloud), Java (BitBucket Server)

Bitbucket is a Git-based source code repository hosting service owned by Atlassian. Bitbucket offers both commercial plans and free accounts with an unlimited number of private repositories.

== Services ==
=== Bitbucket Cloud ===
Bitbucket Cloud (previously known as Bitbucket) is written in Python using the Django web framework.

Bitbucket is mostly used for code and code review. Bitbucket supports the following features:

- Pull requests with code review and comments
- Bitbucket Pipelines, a continuous delivery service
- Two-step verification and required two-step verification
- IP whitelisting
- Merge Checks
- Code search (Alpha)
- Git Large File Storage (LFS)
- Documentation, including automatically rendered README files in a variety of Markdown-like file formats
- Issue tracking
- Wikis
- Static sites hosted on Bitbucket Cloud: Static websites have the bitbucket.io domain in their URL
- Add-ons and integrations
- REST APIs to build third-party applications which can use any development language
- Snippets that allow developers to share code segments or files
- Smart Mirroring

== Bitbucket Server ==
Bitbucket Server
- Developer: Atlassian, Inc.
- Release: 2012
- Stable release: 7.21.0 / 28 February 2022; 4 years ago
- Written in: Java
- Operating system: Platform-independent
- Type: distributed revision control revision control
- License: Proprietary, free for use by official non-profit organizations, charities, and open-source projects, but not governmental, academic or religious organizations
- Website: www.atlassian.com/software/bitbucket/server

Bitbucket Server (formerly known as Stash) is a combination Git server and web interface product written in Java and built with Apache Maven. It allows users to do basic Git operations (such as reviewing or merging code, similar to GitHub) while controlling read and write access to the code. It also provides integration with other Atlassian tools.

Bitbucket Server is a commercial software product that can be licensed for running on-premises. Atlassian provides Bitbucket Server for free to open source projects meeting certain criteria, and to organizations that are non-profit, non-government, non-academic, non-commercial, non-political, and secular. For academic and commercial customers, the full source code is available under a developer source license.

== History ==
Bitbucket started as an independent startup company, founded by Jesper Nøhr in 2008.

On 29 September 2010, Bitbucket was acquired by Atlassian. In September 2015, Atlassian renamed their Stash product to Bitbucket Server. In July 2016, Bitbucket added support for Git Large File Storage (LFS).

In March 2020, Bitbucket Server dropped support for viewing three way diffs and in July 2020, Bitbucket Cloud removed support for its original repository format Mercurial.

== See also ==
- Comparison of source-code-hosting facilities
- Distributed version control
- Git
- GitHub
- Gitea
- GitLab
- Version control
