= CodePlex =

Web-based collaborative software platform

- Website type: Forge
- Available in: English
- Owner: Microsoft
- Website: codeplex.com
- Commercial: no
- Registration: Optional
- Launched: May 2006; 20 years ago
- Current status: Offline

CodePlex was a forge website by Microsoft. While it was active, it allowed shared development of open-source software. Its features included wiki pages, source control based on Mercurial, TFVC, Subversion, or Git, discussion forums, issue tracking, project tagging, RSS support, statistics, and releases.

While CodePlex once encompassed a wide variety of projects, including SQL Server, WPF, and Windows Forms-related projects, its major activities were focused on .NET Framework (including ASP.NET) and SharePoint. The most prominent and used project that was born inside CodePlex, the AJAX Control Toolkit, is a joint project between the community and Microsoft.

== History ==
The initial beta started in May 2006, with the final release a month later in June. A new version of the website was released every three weeks adding additional features and updates.

In 2010, an unrelated CodePlex Foundation was renamed Outercurve Foundation to clear up confusion that there was a direct relationship between the foundation and CodePlex, which is solely owned and run by Microsoft.

Since January 22, 2010, Mercurial distributed source control system has been supported as well, and this support has been enhanced. On March 21, 2012, CodePlex announced the support of Git as a source control option.

On March 31, 2017, Microsoft announced the discontinuation of CodePlex. The original plan was to make CodePlex read-only in October 2017 before finally shutting it down on December 15, 2017. Microsoft partnered with GitHub to allow projects to be migrated to the service. An archive was available as a lightweight site to browse the projects that remain, in a read-only mode. The projects could be downloaded or transferred to GitHub or a similar place. Microsoft finally shut down the archive on October 21, 2021.

== See also ==
- List of free software project directories
- Comparison of source-code-hosting facilities
