= Mozdev.org =

Defunct software development website

mozdev.org
- Screenshot of mozdev.org home page as of Feb 18, 2008
- Website type: free project hosting
- Available in: English
- Creators: David Boswell and Pete Collins
- Website: Archived official website at the Wayback Machine (archived July 3, 2020)
- Commercial: No
- Registration: Optional
- Launched: September 2000; 26 years ago
- Current status: Defunct as of July 2020; 6 years ago (Currently redirects to mozilla.org)

mozdev.org was a website that offered free project hosting, and software development tools to the Mozilla community. It hosted extensions for Firefox, Thunderbird, SeaMonkey and stand-alone Mozilla-based applications. All projects must have been under a license approved by the OSI. According to the site, it hosted over 250 active projects. The site was shut down in July 2020 and currently redirects to mozilla.org.

== See also ==
- Mozilla Foundation
- MDN Web Docs
