= CollabNet =

American software company

CollabNet VersionOne
- Company type: Private
- Industry: Software Company
- Founded: 1999; 27 years ago
- Founder: Tim O'Reilly, Brian Behlendorf and Bill Portelli
- Headquarters: Alpharetta, Georgia, United States
- Key people: Flint Brenton (CEO)
- Products: TeamForge; TeamForge SCM; VersionOne; Continuum; VS
- Website: Office website

CollabNet VersionOne is a software company founded by Tim O’Reilly, Brian Behlendorf, and Bill Portelli, headquartered in Alpharetta, Georgia, United States. CollabNet focuses on value stream management, DevOps, agile management, application lifecycle management (ALM), and enterprise version control.

== History ==
The company was originally founded as CollabNet in 1999 by Tim O’Reilly, Brian Behlendorf, and Bill Portelli, who also served as the company's chief executive officer.

In May 2015, Flint Brenton became president and chief executive officer with Portelli remaining on the board of directors. The company remains privately owned.

CollabNet merged with VersionOne in 2017, becoming CollabNet VersionOne, and began expanding its enterprise value stream management endeavors.

TPG Capital acquired CollabNet VersionOne from Vector Capital, announcing investments in the company up to $500 million over the next years.

Previous additions include the 2010 acquisition of Danube Technologies, a company specializing in Agile/Scrum management software tools (including ScrumWorks Pro) and consulting and training services for organizations implementing Agile. CollabNet also acquired Codesion in 2010. Codesion specialized in cloud development.

The company has historically focused on innovating on its own and through partnerships, from early ALM, to solutions for government use, to the cloud, to DevOps and Value Stream Management.

In January 2020, CollabNet VersionOne (CollabNet) and XebiaLabs announced that the two companies had merged. In April of that year, Arxan joined, the merger of the three companies being known by the name Digital.ai.

== See also ==
- Agile software development
- Continuous Integration
- Continuous delivery
- DevOps Toolchain
- Scrum (software development)
- Value Stream Mapping
