= Collaborative development environment =

Online meeting space for software projects

A collaborative development environment (CDE) is a type of software platform that supports distributed software development by providing a shared online workspace. It enables project stakeholders to collaborate in real time or asynchronously, facilitating communication, documentation, and the coordinated production of deliverables. CDEs are designed to overcome the challenges of working across different time zones and geographical regions by integrating tools such as version control systems, issue tracking, discussion forums, wikis, and code review mechanisms. The term was coined in 2002 by Grady Booch and Alan W. Brown.

It is seen as an evolution from the integrated development environment (IDE), which combined programming tools on the desktop, and the extended development environment (XDE), which combined lifecycle development tools with an IDE (such as Microsoft Azure DevOps and the IBM Rational Rose XDE); while the IDE focuses on tools to support the individual developer, the CDE focuses on supporting the needs of the development team as a whole.

Although growing from a tool base in the software development sector, the CDE has been taken up in other sectors, with teams typically geographically dispersed, where it is beneficial to be able to collaborate across the web, including automotive and aeronautical engineering, movie production, and civil engineering.

== Typical functionalities ==
- Version control system
- Bug tracking system
- Todo list
- Mailing list
- Document management system
- Forum

== See also ==
- Application lifecycle management (ALM)
- Comparison of source-code-hosting facilities
- Forge (software)
- Online integrated development environment (Online IDE or Web IDE)
- Project management software
- Systems development life cycle
- Software project management
- Computer-supported collaboration
