= GitLab =

Open-source Git software package

- Developer: GitLab Inc.
- Release: 2011; 15 years ago
- Stable release: 18.11 / 16 April 2026; 5 months ago
- Written in: Ruby, Go and JavaScript
- Operating system: Cross-platform
- Platform: x86-64, aarch64
- Available in: English
- Type: DevOps platform
- License: Community Edition: MIT License and other software licenses Enterprise Edition: Source-available proprietary software
- Website: about.gitlab.com
- Repository: gitlab.com/gitlab-org/gitlab

GitLab is a software forge primarily developed by GitLab Inc. It is available as either a free software "Community" edition or a proprietary software "Enterprise" edition.

== History ==
GitLab was created in 2011 by Ukrainian programmer Dmytro Zaporozhets. It was a side project, written in Ruby on Rails.

== Components ==
GitLab consists of several components, mostly interconnected by Unix sockets:

- GitLab shell
- GitLab workhorse
- nginx
- Gitaly
- Redis
- Sidekiq
- PostgreSQL
- Gitlab Puma
