= Comparison of issue-tracking systems =

Notable issue tracking systems, including bug tracking systems, help desk and service desk issue tracking systems, as well as asset management systems, include the following. The comparison includes client-server application, distributed and hosted systems.

== General ==
System names listed with a light purple background are no longer in active development.

System	Creator	License	Implementation language(s)	Back end	Launch date	Latest stable release	Latest release date
Apache Bloodhound	Apache Software Foundation	Apache	Python	MySQL, PostgreSQL, SQLite	2012	0.8	2013-08-23; 13 years ago
Apache Allura	Apache Software Foundation	Apache License 2.0	Python	MongoDB	2022	1.22.1	2026-11-02; 13 days ago
Assembla Tickets	Assembla	Proprietary, hosted. Available for free for open source projects	Ruby	MySQL	2008		
Axosoft	Axosoft LLC	Proprietary, SaaS	C#, .NET	SQL Server	2002		
Azure DevOps Server (Team Foundation Server)	Microsoft	Proprietary, commercial	.NET	MS SQL Server 2005 & 2008	2005		
Bugzilla	Mozilla Foundation	MPL	Perl	MySQL, Oracle, PostgreSQL, SQLite	1998-09-19	5.2	2024-09-03; 2 years ago
Debbugs	Debian	GPL	Perl	Flat file, Berkeley DB indexes	Between 1994 and 1999 (Note: Debian's bug tracking system was in place as soon as 1994 according to Ian Jackson's Debbugs webpage. However, Debbugs, as a generic ITS engine, was only uploaded to Debian as version 1 in January 1999.)		
Dolibarr	Dolibarr community	GPL	PHP	MariaDB, MySQL, PostgreSQL, SQL Server (experimental)	2018	24.0.3	2026-11-11; 4 days ago
Faveo Helpdesk	Ladybird Web Solution	Open Software License	PHP	MariaDB, MySQL	2015		
FogBugz	Glitch	Proprietary, SaaS	ASP on Windows, PHP on macOS, FreeBSD, and Linux	SQL Server, MySQL	2000		
Fossil	D. Richard Hipp	BSD	C	SQLite	2006	2.28	2026-03-11; 8 months ago
FusionForge	Various (open source contributors)	GPLv2	PHP	PostgreSQL	2009-02		
GLPI	INDEPNET	GPLv2	PHP	MariaDB, MySQL	2003-11-17		
GNATS	Free Software Foundation	GPL	C, Web Front-end In Perl	Text files with custom daemon/search engine	1992	4.2.0	2015-02-26; 11 years ago
Helix ALM (aka TestTrack)	Perforce Software	Proprietary	C++, Qt5, JavaScript	Oracle, PostgreSQL, SQL Server, SQLite	1996	2024.1	2024-03-01; 2 years ago
HP Quality Center	Hewlett-Packard, formerly Mercury Interactive	Proprietary	.NET (client), Java (server)	Oracle, SQL Server	1995		
Jira	Atlassian	Proprietary. Free community licenses for open source and academic projects	Java	MySQL, PostgreSQL, Oracle, SQL Server	2002	10.1.1	9 October 2024; 30 May 2025
Launchpad	Canonical Ltd.	AGPL	JavaScript, Python	PostgreSQL	2004-01		
MantisBT	Various (open source contributors)	GPL	PHP	MariaDB, MySQL, PostgreSQL, SQL Server (experimental), Oracle (experimental)	2000	2.28.4	2026-07-01; 4 months ago
Microsoft Dynamics CRM	Microsoft	Proprietary, commercial	.NET	Microsoft SQL Server	2003		
OpenProject	OpenProject Foundation e.V.	GPL	Ruby, JavaScript	PostgreSQL	2010		
org-mode	Carsten Dominik	GPL	Emacs	Flat file	2003		
OTRS	OTRS	Proprietary	Perl, JavaScript	MySQL, PostgreSQL, Oracle, SQL Server	2002		
Phabricator	Facebook	Apache	PHP		2010		
Redmine	Jean-Philippe Lang	GPLv2	Ruby	MySQL, PostgreSQL, SQLite	2006	7.0.3	2026-11-01; 14 days ago
Request Tracker	Best Practical Solutions, LLC	GPLv2	Perl	MariaDB, MySQL, PostgreSQL, Oracle, SQLite (testing only)	1999-10-13	6.0.4	2026-10-29; 17 days ago
Roundup	Ka-Ping Yee, Richard Jones	MIT (ZPL v 2.0 for the template system)	Python	SQLite, MySQL, PostgreSQL, anydbm	2001	2.6.0	2026-07-13; 4 months ago
StarTeam	originally Starbase Corporation, currently Borland	Proprietary	C++, Java, etc.	SQL Server recommended, Oracle, IBM Db2 supported	Unknown		
Supportworks	Hornbill Systems	Proprietary	C++, PHP	SQL Server, MySQL, Oracle, Sybase	1994		
SysAid	SysAid Technologies	Proprietary	C#, Java	Derby, Microsoft SQL Server, MySQL, Oracle	2002		
Trac	Edgewall Software	New BSD	Python	SQLite, PostgreSQL, MySQL	2006-10-01		
TrackerSuite.Net	Automation Centre	Proprietary	C#	SQL Server, SQL Server Express	2006		
Trello	Atlassian	SaaS	Node.js	MongoDB	2011		
Tuleap	enalean	GPLv2	php	MySQL	2011		
Twproject	Open Lab	Proprietary, some parts LGPL	Java	all relational (uses Hibernate)	2003		
Wrike	Wrike, Inc.	Proprietary, hosted	Java	PostgreSQL	2006		
YouTrack	JetBrains s.r.o.	Proprietary, stand-alone and hosted, free version, free for open source projects	Java	JavaScript, Kotlin	2009		
Zammad	Zammad GmbH	AGPL	Ruby	MariaDB, MySQL, PostgreSQL	2016	7.0	2026-03-04; 8 months ago
BoldDesk	Syncfusion	Proprietary (Commercial SaaS)	Microsoft .NET Framework	Google Cloud Platform (GCP) and Microsoft Azure; containerized microservices architecture	2022	2.0	November 2, 2026
System	Creator	License	Implementation language(s)	Back end	Launch date	Latest stable release	Latest release date

== Features ==
System	Documentation integration/generation, reporting	Test planning integration	Customizable workflow	Unicode support	Custom fields	SLA	Plugin API	Multiple projects	Full-text search	Indexed full-text search	Indexed file search	Edit conflict warning
Apache Bloodhound	Yes, integrated wiki	Yes	Yes	Yes	Yes	No	Yes	Yes (as of 0.6)	Yes	Yes uses Whoosh	No	No
Assembla Tickets	Yes, Wiki syntax, email notification, linking to Subversion commits, document manager, charts, reports, notifications	Yes	Yes	Yes	Yes	No	Yes	Yes	No	Unknown	No	No
Axosoft	Yes, Team Wiki, Burndown, GitHub and TortoiseSVN integration, dashboards, custom reports for OnPremises, e-mail notifications and alerts, customer portal, RSS	No	Yes	Yes	Yes	Yes	Yes	Yes				No
Azure DevOps Server (Team Foundation Server)	Yes - workflow definitions, process documentation	Yes	Yes	Yes	Yes	No	Yes	Yes	Yes	Yes	Yes	No
Bugzilla	Yes, reporting: integrated reports and charts, scheduled reports by mail	Yes	Yes	Yes	Yes	No	Yes	Yes	Yes	Yes When using MySQL MyISAM or Oracle Database but not PostgreSQL		Yes
Debbugs	No	No	No	Yes	No	No	No	Unknown			No	No
Faveo Helpdesk	Yes, Integrated Social Media, In-built Knowledge Base and Reporting	No	Yes	Yes	Yes	Yes	Yes	—N/a	Yes	No	No	No
FogBugz	Yes, Integrated wiki	No	Yes	Yes	Yes	No	Yes	Yes	Yes	Yes	No	Yes
Fossil	Yes, Integrated Wiki in addition to integrated versioned project documentation via web ui.	No	No	No	Yes	No	No	Yes	No	No		No
FusionForge	Yes, integrated Mediawiki, discussion forums, news blogs, email integration, export to CSV, reporting graphs	No	Yes	Yes	Yes	No	Yes	Yes	Yes			No
GLPI	Yes, Contains a proprietary knowledge base of sorts	Yes	Yes	Yes	Yes	Yes	Yes	Yes	Yes	Yes	Yes	No
GNATS	No	No	No	No	No	No	No	Unknown				No
Helix ALM	Yes - Advanced reporting, integrated charts, export to Excel, workflow with triggers	Yes	Yes	Yes	Yes	No	Yes	Yes	Yes	Yes		No
HP Quality Center	Yes	Yes	Yes	No	Yes	No	Yes	Yes	No	No	No	No
Jira	Yes, Dashboard with reporting widgets (Open Social) Excel, Word, customizable charts, Confluence (Enterprise wiki)	Yes	Yes	Yes	Yes	Yes	Yes	Yes	Yes	Yes Uses Lucene	Optional	No
Launchpad	Yes	Unknown	Unknown	Unknown	Unknown	Unknown	Unknown	Unknown	Unknown	Unknown	Unknown	No
MantisBT	Yes, Integration of MediaWiki, DokuWiki, XWiki	No	Yes	Yes	Yes	No	Yes	Yes	Yes	Yes	No	Yes
Microsoft Dynamics CRM	Yes, reporting: integrated charts and reports, export to Excel, Mail Merge	No	Yes	Yes	Yes	No	Yes	Unknown				No
org-mode	Yes, org-mode has built-in export to HTML, Latex, .md and literate programming capabilities for multiple languages in a single document	No	Yes	Yes	Yes	No	No	Yes	Yes			No
OTRS	Yes, Advanced reporting, configurable dashboards	No	Yes	Yes	Yes	Yes	Yes	Yes	Yes	Yes	No	No
Phabricator	Yes, integrated wiki and limited burn down charts	Yes	No	Yes	Yes	No	Yes	Yes	Yes	Yes	Yes	No
Redmine	Yes, integrated wiki, discussion forums, news blogs, email integration, calendars, Gantt Charts, RSS, export to PDF, export to Excel/CSV	Yes	Yes	Yes	Yes	Optional	Yes	Yes	Yes	Optional, when using PostgreSQL	Optional	Yes
Request Tracker	Yes, MediaWiki	No	Yes	Yes	Yes	Yes	Yes	Yes	Yes	Yes		No
Roundup	Yes, wiki can be integrated or linked	No, can be implemented at tracker level	Yes	Yes	Yes	No, can be implemented at tracker level	Yes	Yes	Yes	Yes xapian, whoosh, SQLite FTS, PostgreSQL FTS, native	Yes	Yes
StarTeam	No	Yes	Yes	No	Yes	No	No	Unknown				No
Supportworks	Yes - Integrated reporting wizard, customizable PHP reporting tool, dashboard, optional interface with Crystal Reports, export to Microsoft Excel/CSV, knowledge base, optional asset management tool	No	Yes	No	Yes	Yes	Yes	Unknown				No
SysAid	Yes - LDAP/Email/Calendar integration, integrated Asset Management, integrated reporting, SSO, custom fields, export to CSV/PDF, KB	No	Yes	Yes	Yes	Yes	Yes	Yes	Yes	Unknown	No	No
Teamwork	Yes	Yes	Yes	Yes	Yes	Yes	No	Yes	Yes	Yes Uses Lucene		No
Trac	Yes, integrated wiki	Yes	Yes	Yes	Yes	No	Yes	Yes	Yes	No		Yes
TrackerSuite.Net	Yes. Dashboards. Graphical reports. Integration with Crystal Reports. Reports can be exported to Microsoft Excel.	Yes	Yes	Yes	Yes	No	Yes	Yes	Yes	No	No	No
Tuleap	Yes, Kanban boards, Scrum planning and burndown charts, pies, Gantt, barrs, cardwall, Document Manager with approval workflow and fine grained permissions, wikis	Yes	Yes	Yes	Yes	Yes	Yes	Yes	Yes with plugin fulltext	Yes with plugin fulltext	No	No
Wrike	Yes, real-time customized reports, export to Excel, scheduled reports by mail, alerts, discussions, Gantt charts,	No	Yes	Yes	Yes	No	Yes	Yes	Unknown			Yes
YouTrack	Yes: Wiki syntax, custom workflow, custom issue attributes, notifications (email, jabber, RSS, etc.), email integration, reports, export to HTML and CSV, integration with VCSs.	Yes	Yes	Yes	Yes	Yes	Yes	Yes	Yes	Yes (Uses Lucene)		No
Zammad	Yes: Documentation integration/generation, reporting: integrated knowledge base, dashboard	No	No	Yes	Yes	Yes	Yes	Yes	Yes	Yes	Yes	Yes
System	Dynamic documentation integration/generation	Test planning integration	Customizable workflow	Unicode support	Custom fields	SLA	Plugin API	Multiple projects	Full-text search	Indexed full-text search	Indexed file search	Edit conflict warning

== Input interfaces ==
System	Web	Mobile web	Email	CLI	GUI	REST	SOAP	Mylyn	Visual Studio	IntelliJ IDEA	Others
Apache Bloodhound	Yes	No	Optional	No	No	No	No	Yes	No	No	Yes XMLRPC
Assembla Tickets	Yes	No	Yes	Yes	No	Yes	No	Yes	No	Yes	No
Axosoft	Yes	No	Yes	No	Yes	Yes	Yes	No	No	No	Yes - iPhone
Bugzilla	Yes	No	Yes	Yes	Yes	Yes	Yes	Yes	No	Yes	Yes XMLRPC
Debbugs	No	No	Yes	Yes	No	No	No	No	No	No	No
Dolibarr	Yes	Yes	Yes	No	Yes	Yes	No	No	No	No	No
Faveo Helpdesk	Yes	No	Yes	No	No	Yes	No	No	No	No	Yes - Android App iOS App
FogBugz	Yes	No	Yes	Yes	No	Yes	No	Yes	No	Yes	Yes XML
Fossil	Yes	No	No	Yes	No	No	No	No	No	No	No
FusionForge	Yes	No	No	No	No	No	Yes	No	No	No	No
GLPI	Yes	No	Yes	No	No	Yes	No	No	No	No	No
GNATS	Yes	No	Yes	Yes	Yes	No	No	No	No	No	No
Helix ALM	Yes	No	Yes	No	Yes	Yes	Yes	No	Yes	No	Yes - XML
HP Quality Center	Yes	No	No	No	Yes	Yes	No	Yes	No	Yes, via plugin	Yes]
Jira	Yes	Yes	Yes	Yes	Yes	Yes	Yes	Yes	No	Yes	Yes - Android App, iPhone App
Launchpad	Yes	No	Yes	No	No	Yes	No	No	No	No	Yes - Python
MantisBT	Yes	No	Yes	No	No	No	Yes	Yes	No	Yes	Yes - Android App
Microsoft Dynamics CRM	Yes	No	Yes	No	No	No	Yes	No	No	No	No
org-mode	No	No	No	Yes	No	No	No	No	No	No	No
OTRS	Yes	No	Yes	No	No	Yes	Yes	No	No	No	No
Phabricator	Yes	No	Yes	Yes	Yes	Yes	No	No	No	Yes, via plugin	No
Redmine	Yes	Yes	Yes	Partial (Note: The Ruby on Rails console can be used to manually create tickets or replies)	No	Yes	No	Yes	No	Yes	Yes - Android App, iOS App
Request Tracker	Yes	Yes Responsive layout after 1.5.0. Partial in previous versions.	Yes	Yes	No	Yes	No	No	No	No	No
Roundup	Yes	Yes with Jinja2 template, basic support in classic template, can be implemented per tracker	Yes	Yes	No (use web)	Yes new in 2.0	No	No	No	No	Yes XMLRPC
StarTeam	Yes	No	No	No	Yes	No	No	No	Yes	No	No
Supportworks	Yes	No	Yes	No	Yes	Yes	No	No	No	No	No
SysAid	Yes	No	Yes	No	Yes	Yes	Yes	No	No	No	No
Team Foundation Server	Yes	No	Yes	Yes	No	No	Yes	Yes	No	Yes, via plugin	No
Trac	Yes	No	Optional	No	No	No	No	Yes	No	Yes	Yes XMLRPC
TrackerSuite.Net	Yes	No	Yes	No	No	No	No	No	No	No	No
Trello	Yes	Yes	Yes	No	No	Yes	No	No	No	Yes	No
Tuleap	Yes	No	Yes	Yes	No	Yes	Yes	Yes	No	No	No
Twproject	Yes	No	Yes	No	No	No	No	No	No	No	No
Wrike	Yes	No	No	No	No	No	No	No	No	Yes, via plugin	No
YouTrack	Yes	Yes	Yes	No	Yes	Yes	No	Yes	No	Yes	No
Zammad	Yes	No	Yes	Yes	No	Yes	No	No	No	No	No
System	Web	Mobile Web	Email	CLI	GUI	REST	SOAP	Mylyn	Visual Studio	IntelliJ IDEA	Others

== Notification interfaces ==
System	Email	RSS	Atom	XMPP	Twitter
Apache Bloodhound	Yes	Yes	No	No	No
Assembla Tickets	Yes	Yes	No	No	Yes
Axosoft	Yes	Yes	No	No	No
Bugzilla	Yes	Yes	Yes	No	No
Debbugs	Yes	No	No	No	No
Dolibarr	Yes	No	No	No	No
Faveo Helpdesk	Yes	No	No	No	No
FogBugz	Yes	Yes	No	No	No
Fossil	Yes	Yes	No	No	No
FusionForge	Yes	Yes	No	No	No
GLPI	Yes	No	No	Yes	No
GNATS	Yes	No	No	No	No
Helix ALM	Yes	Yes	No	No	No
HP Quality Center	Yes	No	No	No	No
Jira	Yes	Yes	No	Yes	No
MantisBT	Yes	Yes	No	No	Yes
Microsoft Dynamics CRM	Yes	No	No	No	No
org-mode	No	No	No	No	No
OTRS	Yes	No	No	No	No
Phabricator	Yes	No	No	No	No
Redmine	Yes	Yes	Yes	Yes, via plugin	Yes
Request Tracker	Yes	Yes	No	No	No
Roundup	Yes	Yes	Yes	No can be added to tracker with detector	No can be added to tracker with detector
StarTeam	Yes	No	No	No	No
Supportworks	Yes	No	No	No	No
SysAid	Yes	No	No	No	No
Team Foundation Server	Yes	No	No	No	No
Trac	Yes	Yes	No	No	No
TrackerSuite.Net	Yes	No	No	No	No
Twproject	Yes	Yes	No	No	Yes
Wrike	Yes	No	No	No	No
YouTrack	Yes	Yes	No	Yes	No
Zammad	Yes	No	No	No	Yes
System	Email	RSS	Atom	XMPP	Twitter

== Revision control system integration ==
System	Git	Mercurial	Bazaar	Monotone	Darcs	CVS	Subversion	Perforce	AccuRev	ClearCase	Others
Apache Bloodhound	Yes	Yes	Yes	Yes	Yes	Yes	Yes	Optional	Yes	No	No
Assembla Tickets	Yes	Yes	No	No	No	No	Yes	Yes	No	No	No
Axosoft	Yes	Yes	No	No	No	No	Yes	Yes	No	No	Yes VSS, Vault Sourcegear
Bugzilla	Yes	Yes	Yes	No	No	Yes	Yes	Yes	Yes	No	No
Debbugs	No	No	No	No	No	No	No	No	No	No	No
Faveo Helpdesk	No	No	No	No	No	No	No	No	No	No	No
FogBugz	Yes	Yes	No	No	No	Yes	Yes	Yes	No	No	2
Fossil	No	No	No	No	No	No	No	No	Yes	No	1
FusionForge	Yes	Yes	Yes	No	No	Yes	Yes	No	No	No	No
GNATS	No	No	No	No	No	Yes	No	No	No	No	No
Helix ALM	Yes	No	No	No	No	Yes	Yes	Yes	No	No	Yes - Surround SCM
HP Application Lifecycle Management	No	No	No	No	No	Yes	Yes	Yes	Yes	No	No
Jira	Yes	Yes	No	No	No	Yes	Yes	Yes	Yes	No	Yes
MantisBT	Yes	Yes	No	No	No	Yes	Yes	No	No	No	No
Microsoft Dynamics CRM	No	No	No	No	No	No	No	No	No	No	No
org-mode	No	No	No	No	No	No	No	No	No	No	No
OTRS	No	No	No	No	No	No	No	No	No	No	No
Phabricator	Yes	Yes	No	No	No	No	Yes	No	No	No	No
Redmine	Yes	Yes	Yes	No	Yes	Yes	Yes	Yes	No	No	No
Request Tracker	No	No	No	No	No	Yes	Yes	No	No	No	No
Roundup	No	Yes	No	No	Yes	No	Yes	No	No	No	Yes can be implemented for any RCS at tracker level
StarTeam	No	No	No	No	No	No	No	No	No	No	Yes - StarTeam includes revision control
Supportworks	No	No	No	No	No	No	No	No	No	No	No
SysAid	No	No	No	No	No	No	Yes	No	No	No	No
Team Foundation Server	Yes	No	Yes	No	No	No	Yes	No	No	No	Yes - TFS includes revision control
Trac	Yes	Yes	Yes	Yes	Yes	No	Yes	Optional	Yes	No	No
TrackerSuite.Net	No	No	No	No	No	No	No	No	No	No	No
Tuleap	Yes	No	No	No	No	Yes	Yes	No	No	No	No
Twproject	No	No	No	No	No	No	Yes	No	No	No	No
Wrike	No	No	No	No	No	No	Yes	No	No	No	No
YouTrack	Yes	Yes	No	No	No	Yes	Yes	Yes	No	Yes	3
Zammad	No	No	No	No	No	No	No	No	No	No	No
System	Git	Mercurial	Bazaar	Monotone	Darcs	CVS	Subversion	Perforce	AccuRev	ClearCase	Others

== Authentication methods ==
System	Form based	Public key cryptography	Two-factor	OpenID	OAuth	LDAP	Shibboleth	Others
Apache Bloodhound	Yes	Optional	No	Optional	No	Yes	Unknown	No
Assembla Tickets	Yes	No	No	Yes	Yes	Yes (private version)	Unknown	Unknown
Axosoft	Yes	No	No	No	No	Yes	No	No
Bugzilla	Yes	No	No	Optional	No	Yes	Unknown	No
Debbugs	No	No	No	No	No	No	No	No
Faveo Helpdesk	Yes	No	No	No	Yes	Yes	No	No
FogBugz	Yes	Unknown	Unknown	Unknown	Unknown	Yes	Unknown	Unknown
Fossil	Unknown	Unknown	Unknown	Unknown	Unknown	No	Unknown	Unknown
FusionForge	Yes	No	No	Yes	No	Yes	No	Yes, CAS
GLPI	Yes	No	Yes	No	No	Yes	No	No
GNATS	Unknown	Unknown	Unknown	Unknown	Unknown	No	Unknown	Unknown
Helix ALM	Yes	Optional	No	Optional	No	Yes	No	Yes - custom DLL, SAML
HP Quality Center	No	No	No	No	No	Yes	No	Unknown
Jira	Yes	No	No	Yes	Yes	Yes	Yes, via plugin	Yes, via Crowd
MantisBT	Yes	No	No	Yes	Yes	Yes	Unknown	No
Microsoft Dynamics CRM	Unknown	Unknown	Unknown	Unknown	Unknown	Yes	Unknown	Unknown
org-mode	Unknown	Unknown	Unknown	Unknown	Unknown	No	Unknown	Unknown
OTRS	Yes	Yes	Yes	Unknown	Unknown	Yes	Unknown	Unknown
Phabricator	Yes	No	Yes	No	Yes	Yes	No	No
Redmine	Yes	Yes	Yes	Yes	No	Yes	Yes, via Apache (using mod_rails)	No
Request Tracker	Yes	Unknown	Unknown	Yes	Unknown	Yes	Unknown	Yes
Roundup	Yes	No	Yes	Yes	Unknown	Yes	Yes	Yes
StarTeam	Unknown	Unknown	Unknown	Unknown	Unknown	No	Unknown	Unknown
Supportworks	Unknown	Unknown	Unknown	Unknown	Unknown	Yes	Unknown	Unknown
SysAid	Yes	No	No	No	No	Yes	No	Yes, CAS
Team Foundation Server	Unknown	Unknown	Unknown	Unknown	Unknown	Yes	Unknown	Unknown
Trac	Yes	Optional	No	Optional	No	Yes	Unknown	No
TrackerSuite.Net	Yes	No	No	No	No	Yes	No	No
Tuleap	Yes	No	No	Yes	Yes	Yes	No	No
Twproject	Yes	Unknown	Unknown	Unknown	Unknown	Yes	Unknown	Yes, Simple container auth.
Wrike	Unknown	Unknown	Unknown	Unknown	Unknown	Yes	Unknown	Unknown
YouTrack	Yes	No	Yes	Yes	Yes	Yes	Unknown	Yes: JIRA account
Zammad	Yes	No	No	No	Yes	Yes	Yes	Yes: Twitter, Facebook, Google, Microsoft 365
System	Form based	Public key cryptography	Two-factor	OpenID	OAuth	LDAP	Shibboleth	Others

== Containers ==
System	Docker Image	Helm chart
Apache Bloodhound	Unknown	Unknown
Assembla Tickets	Unknown	Unknown
Axosoft	Unknown	Unknown
Bugzilla	Yes (Not official)	Yes
Debbugs	Unknown	Unknown
Faveo Helpdesk	Unknown	Unknown
FogBugz	Unknown	Unknown
Fossil	Unknown	Unknown
FusionForge	Unknown	Unknown
GLPI	Unknown	Unknown
GNATS	Unknown	Unknown
Helix ALM	Unknown	Unknown
HP Quality Center	Unknown	Unknown
Jira	Unknown	Unknown
MantisBT	Yes (Not official)	Unknown
Microsoft Dynamics CRM	Unknown	Unknown
org-mode	Unknown	Unknown
OTRS	Unknown	Unknown
Phabricator	Unknown	Unknown
Redmine	Yes (Official)	Yes (Bitnami)
Request Tracker	Unknown	Unknown
Roundup	Yes (Official)	Unknown
StarTeam	Unknown	Unknown
Supportworks	Unknown	Unknown
SysAid	Unknown	Unknown
Team Foundation Server	Unknown	Unknown
Trac	Unknown	Unknown
TrackerSuite.Net	Unknown	Unknown
Tuleap	Unknown	Unknown
Twproject	Unknown	Unknown
Wrike	Unknown	Unknown
YouTrack	Unknown	Unknown
Zammad	Yes	Yes
System	Docker Image	Helm chart

== See also ==
- Comparison of help desk issue tracking software
- List of personal information managers
- Comparison of project management software
- Networked Help Desk
- OSS through Java
