= Comparison of help desk issue tracking software =

This article is a comparison of notable issue tracking systems used primarily for help desks and service desks rather than for bug tracking or project management.

System	Creator	License	Implementation language(s)	Back end	Launch Date
Faveo Helpdesk	Ladybird Web Solution	Proprietary	PHP	MySQL	2015
GLPI	INDEPNET	GPL	PHP	MySQL	2003
HEAT	FrontRange Solutions	Proprietary	.NET	Microsoft SQL Server, Oracle	1990
HelpDesk	Text	Proprietary	JavaScript, Node.js	MySQL, PostgreSQL	2019
Jira Service Management	Atlassian	Proprietary, Free for non-commercial use; hosted & on-premises	Java	MySQL, PostgreSQL, Oracle, Microsoft SQL Server	2003
OTRS	OTRS	Proprietary	Perl	MySQL, PostgreSQL, Oracle, Microsoft SQL Server	2001
Znuny	Znuny GmbH	GPL-3.0	Perl	MySQL, PostgreSQL, Oracle, Microsoft SQL Server	2021
Request Tracker	Best Practical Solutions, LLC	GPL	Perl	MySQL, PostgreSQL, Oracle	1999-10-13
Roundup	Roundup-Team	MIT, Zope	Python	MySQL, PostgreSQL, SQLite, Berkeley DB	2001-08-18
Spiceworks	Spiceworks IT Software	Proprietary; free for use	Ruby	sqlite	2006
Supportworks	Hornbill Systems	Proprietary	Visual C++ and PHP	Microsoft SQL Server, MySQL, Oracle, Sybase	1994
SysAid	SysAid Technologies	Proprietary	Java, C#	MySQL, Derby, Oracle, Microsoft SQL Server	2002
Tracker	Automation Centre	Proprietary	Groupware, requires Lotus Notes	IBM Lotus Domino	2001
TrackerSuite.Net	Automation Centre	Proprietary	C#	Microsoft SQL Server	2006
Trac	Edgewall Software	BSD-3-Clause	Python	MySQL, PostgreSQL	2004
Zammad	Zammad GmbH	AGPL v3	Ruby	MySQL, PostgreSQL	2016
Zendesk	Zendesk, Inc.	Proprietary	Ruby	MySQL, Amazon AWS, Amazon Redshift	2007
Freshservice	Freshworks, Inc.	Proprietary	Ruby	MySQL, Amazon AWS, Amazon Redshift	2014
Bolddesk	Syncfusion	Proprietary	Microsoft .NET Framework	Google Cloud Platform (GCP)	2022

== See also ==
- Comparison of issue-tracking systems
- Networked Help Desk
- OSS through Java
