= YouTrack =

Proprietary issue tracking and project management system

- Developer: JetBrains
- Release: 29 October 2009; 16 years ago
- Stable release: 2024.2 (Build 35942) / 27 June 2024; 2 years ago
- Written in: JavaScript, Kotlin
- Operating system: Cross-platform
- Type: Project management software, Helpdesk,
- License: Proprietary, free for open source projects
- Website: www.jetbrains.com/youtrack/

YouTrack is a proprietary, commercial browser-based bug tracker, issue tracking system, and project management software developed by JetBrains.

== Overview ==
YouTrack's Ajax-based user interface allows both keyboard and mouse interaction. Searching for issues is implemented via search query syntax and is performed from a single search box.

YouTrack uses the language-oriented programming paradigm. The frontend is written in JavaScript, while the backend relies on Kotlin, a programming language created by the same software house. It uses an embedded Xodus database to read and store data. For remote procedure calls, YouTrack supports a RESTful API. JetBrains offers YouTrack in cloud-hosted and on-premises versions.

YouTrack Standard supports integrations such as imports from Jira, Mailbox Integration, Zendesk integration, and an integrated working environment with Upsource and TeamCity. The platform has pre-built connectors with GitHub, BitBucket, and GitLab.

YouTrack can also be integrated with the Slack workplace. YouTrack can integrate with JetBrains IDEs.

YouTrack provides a REST API, which allows developers to perform various actions such as creating and modifying issues, and creating custom integrations.

== See also ==
- Comparison of issue-tracking systems
- Project management software
- Bug tracking system
