= GNATS =

Issue tracking software

- Developer(s): Chad Walstrom
- Initial release: 1992; 33 years ago
- Stable release: 4.2.0 / February 28, 2015; 10 years ago
- Written in: C
- Operating system: Cross-platform
- Type: Bug tracking system
- License: GPL
- Website: www.gnu.org/software/gnats/

GNATS is the GNU project's issue-tracking software.

GNATS is a set of tools for tracking bugs reported by users to a central site. It allows problem report management and communication with users via various means. GNATS stores all the information about problem reports in its databases and provides tools for querying, editing, and maintenance of the databases.

GNATS is free software, distributed under the terms of the GNU General Public License.

== Usage ==
GNATS is used by GNU packages and NetBSD. The Apache Software Foundation used the software from 1996 to 2002, and the Mutt project until 2006. It is also used, or was used in the past, by the FreeBSD Project, OpenBSD, Juniper Networks, Nordic Optical Telescope, CERN, Green Bank Telescope, NRAO AIPS++, European Software Institute, and the BaBar Project at SLAC.

In early June 2014, FreeBSD announced concrete plans to migrate from GNATS to Bugzilla, claiming that Bugzilla supports finer granularity for categories and keywords. Furthermore, the announcement states that GNATS is missing many features that people expect from a modern bug tracker.

It has been described as having been "the cornerstone" of free software bug-tracking systems.

== History ==
GNATS was written by Heinz G. Seidl of Cygnus Solutions, inspired by BSD Unix's sendbug and filebug programs, and had its first stable release in 1992. Initially, its only interface was via email, but multiple web and graphical interfaces were later added. During the 1990s, other Cygnus employees rewrote it, and a further major rewrite was done for release 4, with other features contributed by users.

Although GNATS is still in use, development slowed since the 4.1 release in 2005. Several changes lingered in the developers' source code repository, and a 4.2 release was discussed in 2012 but no official release was made until some further development, leading to release 4.2.0 on 28 February 2015.

== Features ==
Built as a client-server architecture, GNATS works with many interfaces (described below) including email, command line, and web interfaces. All GNATS databases and configuration can be stored in plain text files, which helps in the modularity of GNATS. Categorisation and recategorisation of bug reports is particularly simple.

== Interfaces ==
Four official interfaces exist for GNATS:

Gnatsweb
A Web interface to query and open tickets, with GNATS running as a background process (a "daemon")
Emacs GNATS mode
An extension (a "major mode") for GNU Emacs and XEmacs allowing direct access to GNAT issue-trackers
send-pr / edit-pr / query-pr
The traditional command line interface to create, edit, and query Problem Reports
TkGnats
A cross-platform application, written in the Tcl/Tk language

Apart from these, custom ones can be developed such as OpenBSD's sendbug interface which collects system information and submits Problem Reports via email.

== See also ==
- Comparison of issue-tracking systems
