= Supportworks =

Development app

- Desktop Client Interface from version 7.3.11
- Developer: Hornbill Systems
- Initial release: 1994; 32 years ago
- Stable release: 7.5 / September 30, 2011; 14 years ago
- Written in: Visual C++ (client) and PHP (web interface)
- Platform: Server: Windows Server 2003 and Windows Server 2008; Rich-client: Windows XP and later Web-based clients: Multi-platform
- Available in: Multiple Languages
- Type: Issue tracking system
- License: Proprietary
- Website: support-works.com

Supportworks is an issue tracking system designed for use in help desk and information technology (IT) environments. Two branches of the software are developed concurrently, Supportworks ITSM, a certified ITIL compatible IT service management (ITSM) solution, and Supportworks Helpdesk Professional.

== Design ==
Issues tracked in Supportworks are known as "calls." Calls are classified using a hierarchical model known as "problem profiles." This model enables a drill down method to classify calls with each level increasing specificity of the classification. Supportworks groups analysts into "support groups." Calls may be assigned to a support group, or to a specific analyst.

A call's state at any given time is denoted by one of several different "condition codes," each is expressed visually by a different color. Black indicates a pending state (that work is in progress on the call) or that the call is "closed" (required work is completed). Blue denotes a call that no one currently has responsibility for; that it has not been "assigned" to or "accepted" by an analyst. Green colored calls are "on hold," meaning further user input is required to complete the call and therefore "paused" for a specific amount of time. Red is reserved for calls that are "off hold" or that require urgent attention.

Each Supportworks call is associated with a service level agreement (SLA). A call's SLA can be generated from its metadata, such as the customer, department, site, inventory item, or problem profile associated with the call. Each SLA incorporates a "response time" and "fix time" related to the call. Triggers are programmed based on the response time and fix time to ensure the SLA is not violated. For instance, if a call is approaching its fix time, but its issue has not been resolved, a help desk manager can be notified, the call can be transferred to a different group, or the call's condition code can be changed.

Supportworks provides a tool to track widespread incidents that may impact a variety of customers known as "issues." Calls can be associated with an issue and closed en masse when an issue has been corrected. Closing such an issue generates an email notification to all customers affected. When an analyst opens the Supportworks client, they are presented with a "Supportworks Today" page displaying, among other things, a list of the current issues.

== Features ==
Supportworks provides an integrated knowledge base application, e-mail integration through a shared mailbox, and the ability to populate a database of customers from external sources such as directory services using LDAP, query results from external databases, CSV files and Excel documents. The forms used to manage information in Supportworks can be customized with a graphical form designer tool. Additional fields can be added to the Supportworks database to support such customizations when necessary.

Supportworks is packaged with a web-based self-service portal, allowing customers to create calls in the system using a web browser, without requiring assistance from an analyst. When a customer creates a call through the self-service portal an email is generated with a reference number for the customer. The reference number allows them to track the progress of their call through the portal. Through this interface they are able to escalate their call, update their call, attach files to their call, and see which analyst is working on their call.

Supportworks can work with or independently of a complementary Hornbill product, Assetworks. Assetworks is an inventory control system and can be used to track any arbitrary set of items. It contains a discovery feature, however, which allows it to auto-populate an inventory by auto-detecting devices connected to a computer network.

== See also ==
- Comparison of issue tracking systems
- Comparison of help desk issue tracking software
