= Networked Help Desk =

- Networked Help Desk logo
- Abbreviation: NHD
- First published: June 2011
- Latest version: 1.0
- Organization: Zendesk
- Base standards: HTTP, JSON, REST
- Related standards: JSR 91: OSS Trouble Ticket API
- Domain: Issue tracking, Bug tracking, Customer relationship management, Project management.
- Website: networkedhelpdesk.org

Networked Help Desk is an open standard initiative to provide a common API for sharing customer support tickets between separate instances of issue tracking, bug tracking, customer relationship management (CRM) and project management systems to improve customer service and reduce vendor lock-in. The initiative was created by Zendesk in June 2011 in collaboration with eight other founding member organizations including Atlassian, New Relic, OTRS, Pivotal Tracker, ServiceNow and SugarCRM. The first integration, between Zendesk and Atlassian's issue tracking product, Jira, was announced at the 2011 Atlassian Summit. By August 2011, 34 member companies had joined the initiative. A year after launching, over 50 organizations had joined. Within Zendesk instances this feature is branded as ticket sharing.

== Basis ==
Support tools are generally built around a common paradigm that begins with a customer making a request or an incident report, these create a ticket. Each ticket has a progress status and is updated with annotations and attachments. These annotations and attachments may be visible to the customer (public), or only visible to analysts (private). Customers are notified of progress made on their ticket until it is complete. If the people necessary to complete a ticket are using separate support tools, additional overhead is introduced in maintaining the relevant information in the ticket in each tool while notifying the customer of progress made by each group in completing their ticket. For example, if a customer support issue is caused by a software bug and reported to a help desk using one system, and then the fix is documented by the developers in another, and analyzed in a customer relationship management tool, keeping the records in each system up-to-date and notifying the customer manually using a swivel chair approach is unnecessarily time-consuming and error-prone. If information is not transferred correctly, a customer may have to re-explain their problem each time their ticket is transferred.

For systems with the Networked Help Desk API implemented, it is possible for several different applications related to a customer's support experience to synchronize data in one uniquely identified shared ticket. While many applications in these domains have implemented APIs that allow data to be imported, exported and modified, Network Help Desk provide a common standard for customer support information to automatically synchronize between several systems. Once implemented, two systems can quickly share tickets with just a configuration change as they both understand the same interface.

Communication between two instances on a specific ticket occurs in three steps, an invitation agreement, sharing of ticket data and continued synchronization of tickets. The standard allows for "full delegation" (analysts in both systems each make public and private comments and synchronize status) as well as "partial delegation" where the instance receiving the ticket can only make private comments and status changes are not synchronized. Tickets may be shared with multiple instances.

== Implementation list ==
System	Implementors	Language	Status	Launch date	Refs
Request Tracker	Ruslan Zakirov of Best Practical	Perl	Complete	2011-08-10	
YouTrack		Java	Complete	2013-01-31	
Zendesk	Darren Boyd, Pierre Schambacher and Josh Lubaway	Ruby	Complete	2011-06-01	
HostBill		PHP	Complete	2012-05-05	
Jira (from Atlassian)		Java	Complete	2011-06-01	
Node.js		JavaScript	Incomplete		

== See also ==
- Comparison of issue-tracking systems
- Enterprise application integration
- Enterprise service bus
- OSS through Java
- Web-oriented architecture
