= Zammad =

Free helpdesk tracking system

- Developer: Zammad Team
- Release: 2016
- Stable release: 7.0 / 4 March 2026; 7 months ago
- Written in: Ruby (Ruby on Rails), TypeScript
- Operating system: Ubuntu, Debian, CentOS, Docker
- Platform: GitHub
- Available in: English (multilingual)
- Type: Helpdesk
- License: AGPL-3.0-only
- Website: zammad.com
- Repository: github.com/zammad/zammad

Zammad is a free helpdesk or issue tracking system. It offers the connection of various channels like email, chat, telephone, Twitter, or Facebook. Zammad is developed in the programming languages Ruby and JavaScript. The name Zammad comes from the Bavarian language and means "together".

== General ==
Zammad was founded by Martin Edenhofer, who was formerly involved in the development of OTRS.

The project asks for active participation in the development. The source code is free software according to the AGPL-3.0-only license and available via git. For this purpose, the Zammad Foundation was founded to ensure the freedom of the software. Inspiration for the Zammad Foundation are the WordPress Foundation, the Free Software Foundation, and the Mozilla Foundation.

== User Interface ==
The user interface is described as modern and attractive. It has been redesigned from scratch and can be used by occasional users without training without any problems. Technologically, the user interface is implemented as a web application with CSS, JavaScript, and HTML5 (including WebSockets), which means that the application runs in the browser – only data is exchanged over the network (in REST). Thus the WebApp feels like a native application and is capable of real-time (information is updated in all clients immediately after creation/change without reloading the application/web page). The design of the interface was developed with Zeughaus Design GmbH.

In version 3.0 Zammad was extended by a knowledge base.

== Backend ==
The backend is realized in Ruby on Rails and communicates with the user interface via REST. Zammad relies on Elasticsearch to speed up search queries.

MySQL, MariaDB, or PostgreSQL are supported as database servers up to Zammad version 6. Zammad version 7 and above will be PostgreSQL only. Nginx or Apache can be used as a web server or reverse proxy.

== Version history ==
The planned release cycle was 4 weeks, on the 14th of the month.

Version	Published	Significant changes
1.0.0	14 October 2016	Sources: First Version
1.1.0	14 November 2016	Source: Release of REST API v1; Ruby API Lib https://github.com/zammad/zammad-api-client-ruby; PHP API Lib https://github.com/zammad/zammad-api-client-php; Integration of Sipgate.io; Automatic assignment of the organization based on the email domain
1.1.1	14 December 2016	Bugfix release
1.2.0, 1.1.2, 1.0.3	16 January 2017	Feature and Bugfix release
1.3.0, 1.2.1, 1.1.3, 1.0.4	15 February 2017	Feature, Security, and Bugfix release
1.4.0, 1.3.1, 1.2.2, 1.1.4	16 March 2017	Feature and Bugfix release
1.5.0, 1.4.1, 1.3.2, 1.2.3	21 April 2017	Feature and Bugfix release
2.0.0, 1.5.1	11 September 2017	Major Release and Maintenance: LDAP Integration; Absence management assistant; Exchange integration; Role management
2.1.0,2.0.1	25 October 2017	Minor and Feature release: Reporting Function; check_mk Integration
2.2.0, 2.1.1	6 December 2017	Minor and Feature release: i-doit Integration as CMDB; Emails can be forwarded incl. attachments
2.3.0, 2.2.1, 2.1.2	31 January 2018	Minor and Feature release: Chat Integration was improved
2.4.0, 2.3.1, 2.2.2	29 March 2018	Feature release: Auto-completion for email addresses; REST API; Breaking Change: Changes in the authorization management
2.5.0, 2.4.1	6 June 2018	Feature release: Automation of ticket assignment; CSV Import
2.6.0, 2.5.1	10 August 2018	Minor, Feature and Bugfix release: CTI Integration; better filter function for emails; improved search function in the REST-API
2.7.0, 2.6.1	25 October 2018	Minor and Bugfix release: SMS Integration; Print layout; Changes to the date format
2.8.0, 2.7.1	3 December 2018	Minor and Bugfix release: Integration of Placetel as CTI interface; Twitter API
2.9.0, 2.8.1, 2.7.2	14 February 2019	Minor and Bugfix release: Attachment preview realized; Timestamp over time zones improved
3.0	6 June 2019	Major release: more languages added; external authentication sources (Microsoft account, Azure AD, or OAuth2); Zammad Knowledge Base
3.1.0, 3.0.1	11 July 2019	Minor and Bugfix release: additional CTI providers integrated; realized text modules for groups
3.2.0, 3.1.1	3 December 2019	Minor and Bugfix release: SAML authentication; Chat module was extended
3.3.0, 3.2.1	3 March 2020	Minor and Bugfix release: Security updates; Automation improved: with Triggers and depending on the calendar
3.4.0, 3.3.1	15 June 2020	Minor and Bugfix release: S/MIME Integration; Google OAuth Integration; Zammad + ServiceNow Integration improved
3.5.0, 3.4.1	21 September 2020	Minor and Bugfix release: Easier process to delete a user (for better privacy); Agents can now also be customers (and vice versa)
3.6.0, 3.5.1	16 November 2020	Minor, Security and Bugfix release: Webhooks; Mailbox Archive
4.0	25. March 2021	Major release: integration of Grafana, Kibana, GitLab und GitHub; better design at mobile devices
4.1	8. June 2021	Minor release: session Timeout; Freshdesk import possibility
5.0	5. October 2021	Major release: Integration MessageBird; Core Workflows-Function; Integration with Jira; better User Experience
5.0.1	8. October 2021	Minor release: only security update
5.0.2	28. October 2021	Minor release: only security update
5.0.3	7. December 2021	Minor release: only security update
5.1.0	14. March 2022	Minor release: 12h time format possible; breaking Changes
5.1.1	20. April 2022	Minor release: Password & forgot password feature
5.2	20. April 2022	Minor release: Multi organizations for customers; Multi LDAP integration; .ics Preview - No more guesswork; Multi tree select
7.0	4 March 2026	Major release: AI Agents for Automated Ticket Categorization; AI-Powered Ticket Summaries; AI Writing Assistant for Replies and Translations; Enhanced Workflows, LDAP, and Webhook Integrations

== Awards ==
- Bronze OSBAR (Open Source Business Award 2016), on 7 December 2016, awarded by the Open Source Business Alliance
- 1st place in the Thomas Krenn Award 2017, on 12 March 2017
- DINACon Award in Category 1: Best Open Source Project, on 18 October 2019, which means that Zammad was also nominated for the Digital Economy Award
