= Technical support =

Maintenance service of electronic consumers

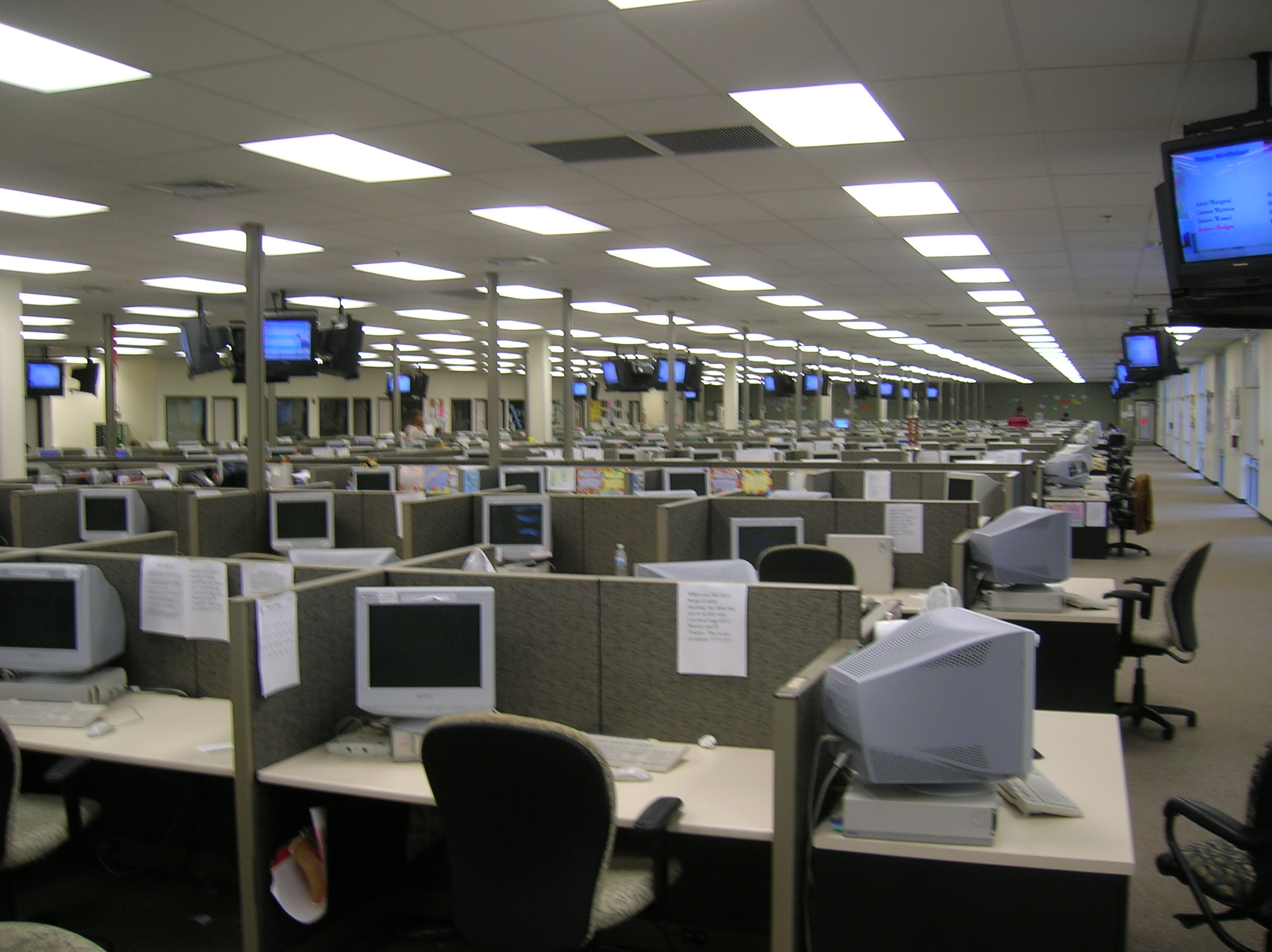
A call center in Lakeland, Florida in 2006

Technical support, commonly shortened as tech support, is a form of customer service provided to assist users in resolving problems with products such as consumer electronics and software. Technical support is typically delivered through call centers, online chat, and email services. In addition, many companies operate online forums or discussion boards where customers can provide peer-to-peer assistance, a practice shown to reduce the workload and costs of formal support channels.

== Outsourcing tech support ==
With the increasing use of technology in modern times, there is a growing requirement to provide technical support. Many organizations locate their technical support departments or call centers in countries or regions with lower costs. Dell outsourced its technical support and customer service operations to India in 2001; some of these jobs were later moved back to the United States. There has also been a growth in companies specializing in providing technical support to other organizations, often referred to as Managed Service Providers (MSPs).

For businesses needing to provide technical support, outsourcing allows them to maintain high availability of service, especially during peak demand or product launches. Such arrangements may reduce operational costs and enable core employees to focus on primary responsibilities. It also provides access to specialized personnel with technical expertise beyond the internal workforce.

== Artificial intelligence and labor impact ==
Many companies now use generative artificial intelligence and AI agents to handle routine technical support duties like basic troubleshooting, ticket sorting, and writing automated responses. Research suggests this technology noticeably boosts worker efficiency; a 2025 study in The Quarterly Journal of Economics found that access to an AI assistant increased support agents' hourly resolution rates by 14% overall, and by 34% for novice workers.

The industry expects AI to take over an even larger share of these tasks in the future. In 2025, Gartner estimated that AI agents would handle 80% of common customer service issues without human help by 2029. Real-world deployments are already showing similar results; when the financial firm Klarna introduced an OpenAI chatbot in 2024, it managed two-thirds of their standard inquiries–a workload that would normally require around 700 full-time employees.

This growing reliance on automation is directly impacting job projections. The U.S. Bureau of Labor Statistics predicts a 3% decline in employment for computer support specialists between 2025 and 2035. The agency points to automated troubleshooting software and chatbots as a primary driver for the drop, noting that most future job openings in the field will come from workers retiring or changing careers rather than new job creation.

== Multi-level tech support ==
Technical support is often subdivided into tiers, or levels, in order to better serve a business or customer base. The number of levels a business uses to organize its technical support group is dependent on the business's needs regarding its ability to sufficiently serve customers or users. The purpose of a multi-tiered support system is to improve efficiency by matching issue complexity with technician expertise. Success of the organizational structure is dependent on the technicians' understanding of their level of responsibility and commitments, their customer response time commitments, and when to appropriately escalate an issue and to which level. A common support structure revolves around a three-tiered technical support system. Remote computer repair is a method for troubleshooting software related problems via remote desktop connections.

=== L1 Support ===
Tier I (or Level 1, abbreviated as T1 or L1) is the first technical support level. The first job of a Tier I specialist is to gather the customer's information and determine the issue by analyzing symptoms and figuring out the underlying problem. When analyzing the symptoms, it is important for the technician to identify what the customer is trying to accomplish so that time is not wasted on "attempting to solve a symptom instead of a problem."

Once identification of the underlying problem is established, the specialist can begin sorting through the possible solutions available. Technical support specialists in this group typically handle straightforward and simple problems while "possibly using some kind of knowledge management tool." This includes troubleshooting methods such as verifying physical layer issues, resolving username and password problems, uninstalling/reinstalling basic software applications, verification of proper hardware and software set up, and assistance with navigating around application menus. Personnel at this level have a basic to general understanding of the product or service and may not always have the expertise for complex issues. They are expected to resolve most straightforward problems, typically 70–80% of reported cases.

=== L2 Support ===
Tier II (or Level 2, abbreviated as T2 or L2) is a more in-depth technical support level than Tier I and therefore costs more as the technicians are more experienced and knowledgeable on a particular product or service. It is synonymous with level 2 support, support line 2, administrative level support, and various other headings denoting advanced technical troubleshooting and analysis methods. Technicians in this realm of knowledge are responsible for assisting Tier I personnel in solving basic technical problems and for investigating elevated issues by confirming the validity of the problem and seeking known solutions related to these more complex issues. However, prior to the troubleshooting process, it is important that the technician review the work order to see what has already been accomplished by the Tier I technician and how long the technician has been working with the particular customer. This is key to meeting both customer and business needs as it allows the technician to prioritize the troubleshooting process and properly manage their time.

If a problem is new and/or personnel from this group cannot determine a solution, they are responsible for elevating this issue to the Tier III technical support group. In addition, many companies may specify that certain troubleshooting solutions be performed by this group to help ensure the intricacies of a challenging issue are solved by providing experienced and knowledgeable technicians. This may include, but is not limited to, onsite installations or replacement of various hardware components, software repair, diagnostic testing, or the utilization of remote control tools to take over the user's machine for the sole purpose of troubleshooting and finding a solution to the problem.

=== L3 Support ===
Tier III (or Level 3, abbreviated as T3 or L3) is the highest level of support in a three-tiered technical support model responsible for handling the most difficult or advanced problems. It is synonymous with level 3 support, 3rd-line support, back-end support, support line 3, high-end support, and various other headings denoting expert-level troubleshooting and analysis methods. These individuals are subject-matter experts who support both Tier I and II personnel and contribute to developing solutions for new or previously unresolved issues. Note that Tier III technicians have the same responsibility as Tier II technicians in reviewing the work order and assessing the time already spent with the customer so that the work is prioritized and time management is sufficiently utilized. If it is at all possible, the technician will work to solve the problem with the customer as it may become apparent that the Tier I and/or Tier II technicians simply failed to discover the proper solution. Upon encountering new problems, however, Tier III personnel must first determine whether or not to solve the problem and may require the customer's contact information so that the technician can have adequate time to troubleshoot the issue and find a solution. Typically, a developer or someone who knows the code or backend of the product is the Tier 3 support person.

In some instances, an issue may be so problematic to the point where the product cannot be salvaged and must be replaced. Such extreme problems are also sent to the original developers for in-depth analysis. If it is determined that a problem can be solved, this group is responsible for designing and developing one or more courses of action, evaluating each of these courses in a test case environment, and implementing the best solution to the problem.

== Scams ==
A common scam typically involves a cold caller claiming to be from a technical support department of a company like Microsoft. These scams have often originated from call centers in various countries targeting users in English-speaking regions, though increasingly they also operate domestically. The scammer will instruct the user to download a remote desktop program and once connected, use social engineering techniques that typically involve Windows components to persuade the victim that they need to pay in order for the computer to be fixed and then proceeds to steal money from the victim's credit card.

== See also ==
- Call board
- Comparison of issue-tracking systems
- Comparison of help desk issue tracking software
- Help desk
- Help desk software
- Customer support
