= Application lifecycle management =

Product management of computer programs throughout their development lifecycles

Application lifecycle management (ALM) is the product lifecycle management (governance, development, and maintenance) of computer programs. It encompasses requirements management, software architecture, computer programming, software testing, software maintenance, change management, continuous integration, project management, and release management.

== ALM vs. Software Development Life Cycle ==
ALM is a broader perspective than the Software Development Life Cycle (SDLC), which is limited to the phases of software development such as requirements, design, coding, testing, configuration, project management, and change management. ALM continues after development until the application is no longer used, and may span many SDLCs.

== Integrated ALM ==
A research director with research firm Gartner proposed changing the term ALM to ADLM (Application Development Life-cycle Management) to include DevOps, the software engineering culture and practice that aims at unifying software development (Dev) and software operation (Ops).

== ALM software suites ==
Some specialized software suites for ALM are:

Name	Released by
Polarion ALM	Siemens
Azure DevOps for Visual Studio Application Lifecycle Management	Microsoft
Enterprise Architect	Sparx Systems
GitLab	GitLab
Helix ALM	Perforce
IBM Rational	IBM
JIRA	Atlassian
Micro Focus Application Lifecycle Management	Micro Focus
Mylyn	Eclipse Foundation
Parasoft DTP	Parasoft
Protecode System 4	Protecode
PTC Integrity	PTC
Pulse	Genuitec
Rocket Aldon	Rocket Software
SAP Solution Manager	SAP
StarTeam	Borland
TeamForge	CollabNet
Tuleap	Enalean

== See also ==
- Application Lifecycle Framework
- Business transaction management
- Open Services for Lifecycle Collaboration
- Systems development life-cycle
- Software project management
  - Comparison of project management software
  - Bug tracking system
  - Forge (software)
