= Assembla =

Software company

- Assembla's logo as of late 2024.
- Website type: Community / project hosting
- Available in: English
- Owners: Idera, Inc.
- Website: get.assembla.com
- Commercial: Yes
- Launched: 2005; 21 years ago
- Current status: Online

Assembla is a web-based version control and project management software as a service provider for enterprises. It was founded in 2005 and acquired by Idera, Inc. in 2018. It offers Git, Perforce Helix Core and Apache Subversion repository management, integrations with other collaboration tools such as Trello, Slack, GitHub and JIRA. Assembla also offers integrations with customer's managed private clouds.

== History ==
The company was officially opened in 2005, and was headed by Andy Singleton, creator of PowerSteering Software.

Initially, Assembla offered free on-demand tools such as Trac and Subversion hosting. However, starting from October 2008, Assembla implemented a pricing model for certain products.

In 2012, Assembla partnered with Perforce Software to provide on-demand versions of Perforce’s Software Version Management tool, Helix Core. This integration includes team tools from Assembla, available for an additional fee.

In 2013, Assembla released a set of tools related to Agile development and Continuous Delivery processes called "Renzoku." These are now included as part of the core offering for the team and enterprise plans.

In May 2016, Assembla was purchased by Venture Equity provider Scaleworks. The company is currently based in San Antonio, Texas.

On Jan 18th 2018, Assembla acquired Cornerstone, a Subversion client for macOS.

=== Acquisition by Idera, Inc. ===
On November 1, 2018, Idera, Inc. announced its acquisition of Assembla to integrate its Developer Tools division. This acquisition expanded Idera's DevOps capabilities by integrating Assembla's secure source code management solutions with other tools in its portfolio, such as the ones provided by TestRail, Xray - Test Management, Embarcadero or Ranorex.

== Products ==
Assembla is a source code management tool specializing in providing cloud-based version control services for code projects and agile software development. For users of their cloud repositories, Assembla also provides an additional project management tool.

Assembla hosts more than 100,000 client projects. Their customer base includes game development firms, consultants, outsourcers, and digital agencies. Assembla offers Apache Subversion, Git, and Perforce code repositories. Additionally, Assembla integrates with tools such as Slack, GitHub, and JIRA.

== See also ==
- Comparison of free software hosting facilities
- Comparison of issue-tracking systems
- SourceForge
- Google Code
- CodePlex
