= NHD =

NHD may refer to:

- National History Day, US
- National Hydrography Dataset, US
- Networked Help Desk
- New Hacker's Dictionary, of computer slang
- Noordhollands Dagblad, a Dutch newspaper
- Al Minhad Air Base, United Arab Emirates, IATA code
- Nunhead railway station, London, England, station code
- nHD, a graphic-display resolution of 640x360 pixels
- Ava Guarani language of Paraguay, Brazil, and Argentina, ISO 639-3 code
