= Debbugs =

- Original author: Ian Jackson
- Release: 1994; 32 years ago
- Stable release: 2.6.4 / 4 March 2025
- Written in: Perl, others
- Operating system: Debian
- Platform: Linux
- Type: Issue tracking system
- License: GNU General Public License
- Website: www.debian.org/Bugs/
- Repository: salsa.debian.org/debbugs-team/debbugs.git

Debbugs is the software powering the Debian project's issue tracking system. Uniquely it doesn't have any form of web-interface to edit bug reports – all modification is done through email. Debbugs was mainly written by Ian Jackson, former Debian project leader.

Debbugs consists of a set of scripts which maintain a database of problem reports. The scripts have been parameterised so that they can be used for other projects besides Debian. The system runs on Unix-like operating systems such as Unix and Linux. Most of the source code is written in Perl. It is free software, licensed under the GNU General Public License.

It is strongly recommended that people use the reportbug program when reporting bugs in Debian.

== History ==
Debbugs started as a rudimentary issue tracking system in 1994. The software was generalized starting from 1997 but was only officially released as Debbugs 1 in January 1999.

Soon after the GNOME project abandoned Debbugs, the KDE project also switched to Bugzilla in 2002.

== Deployments ==
The oldest and largest deployment of Debbugs is the Debian project's. As of March 2018, the Debian debbugs instance had handled over 890,000 bug reports.

The GNU Project has deployed a public instance of debbugs that can be used by GNU software or GNU Savannah-hosted free software.

== Integration ==
Ubuntu's Launchpad recognizes and integrates with Debian's debbugs instance.
