= MACD operations =

Computer network terminology

MACD operations are basic actions (Move, Add, Change, Delete) taken by computer network or telecom service agents in the support of hardware and services. It can also refer to the "hours" spent and billed doing those kinds of support tasks.

== See also ==
- Call center
- Customer service
- Technical support
