= ALMtoolbox =

- Industry: Software
- Founded: 2009
- Founder: Tamir Gefen
- Headquarters: Petah Tikva, Israel
- Website: almtoolbox.com

ALMtoolbox (until 2015: GoMidjets) is an Israeli source code management and application lifecycle management (ALM) software company. Its main line of products is an enhancement toolbox for IBM Rational Software products.

== History ==
The company was founded in 2009 by Tamir Gefen under the name GoMidjets, who previously worked on configuration management and ALM projects for the Israeli Air Force. For a long time Gefen was an active participant in IBM DeveloperWorks and in other configuration management forums; he was recognized as the fourth most active DeveloperWorks contributor. After studying the forums' users' most requested features in Rational Software products Gefen started GoMidjets and developed three ClearCase plug-ins according to market needs that he learned and marketed the tools he developed through the forums.

The company received the 2010 IBM Beacon Award and the 2011 IBM Champion Award. It is in a limited partnership with IBM.

In 2015, the company was renamed to ALMtoolbox.

== Products ==
- ClearCheck - Health Checks for Rational ClearCase
- ClearEnv - Setup Work Environments for Rational ClearCase
- R&D Reporter (formerly CompBL) - Real-time Visibility and Reporting on ClearCase UCM Projects' Status
- Visual Annotate - drill-down into the history of any code line in ClearCase files ("blame")
