= GLPI =

Tracking system software

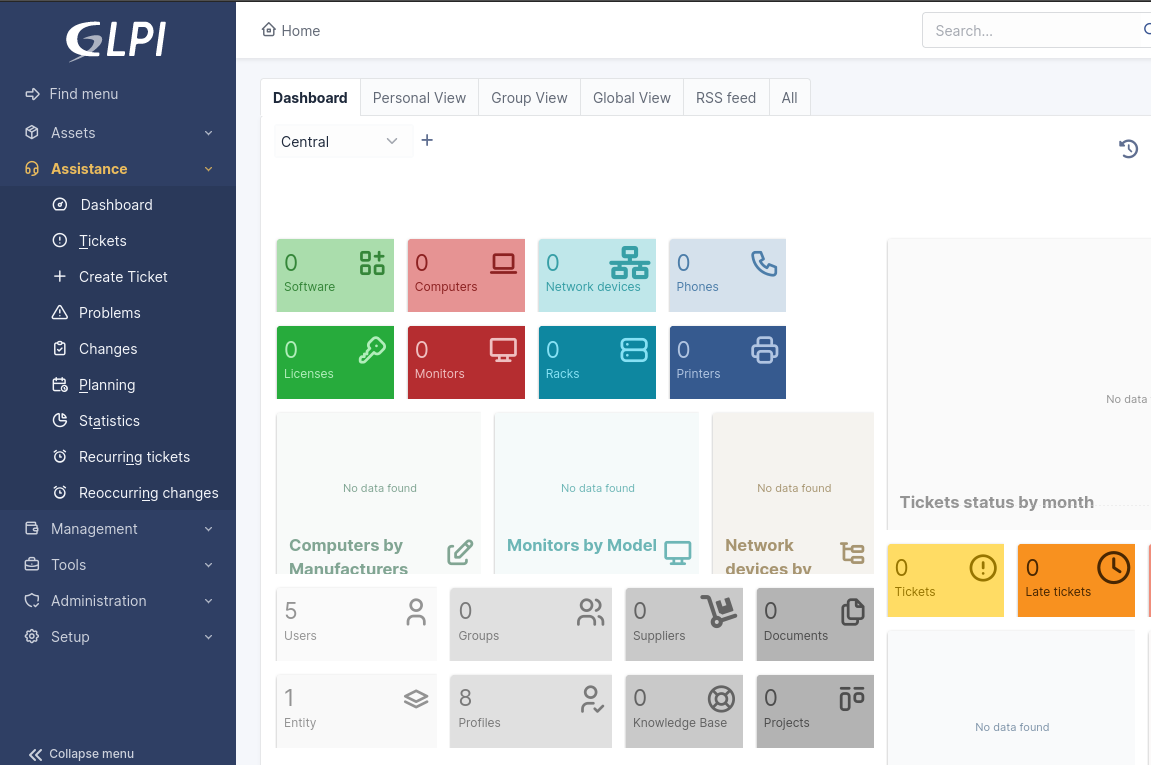
- GLPI home screen
- Original author: Teclib (since 2015) INDEPNET (2003-2015)
- Developers: Current Developers: Teclib' & Contributors; Original Developers: Jean-Mathieu Doléans, Julien Dombre & Bazile Lebeau
- Stable release: 12.0.2 / 12 November 2026; 0 days ago
- Written in: PHP
- Platform: Cross-platform
- Type: IT asset management, Issue tracking system, Project Management & Service desk
- License: Free software GPL v3
- Website: www.glpi-project.org
- Repository: github.com/glpi-project/glpi/releases

GLPI (acronym: French: Gestionnaire Libre de Parc Informatique, or "Free IT Equipment Manager" in English) is an open source IT Asset Management, issue tracking system and service desk system. This software is written in PHP and distributed as open-source software under the GNU General Public License.

GLPI is a web-based application helping companies to manage their information system. The solution is able to build an inventory of all the organization's assets and to manage administrative and financial tasks. The system's functionalities help IT Administrators to create a database of technical resources, as well as a management and history of maintenances actions. Users can declare incidents or requests (based on asset or not) thanks to the Helpdesk feature.

== History ==
The GLPI Community based-project started in 2003 and was directed by the INDEPNET association. Through the years, GLPI became widely used by both communities and companies, leading to a need of professional services around the system. Whereas the INDEPNET Association did not intend to offer services around the software, in 2008 the Association created a Partners' Network in order to achieve various objectives:

The first objective was to build an ecosystem where Partners could participate in GLPI Project. Secondly, Partners would financially support the association, in order to ensure the necessary software development. And finally, the ecosystem would guarantee a service delivery through a known and identified Network, directly connected to INDEPNET.

In 2009, Teclib’ started to integrate the software, developed the GLPI code and implemented new features. During summer 2015, the GLPI's Community leaders decided to transfer the roadmap management and the development leadership to Teclib’, so that Teclib´becomes editor of the GLPI system ensuring the software R&D.

The code remains under a GPL license and keeps its open source nature. The GLPI system continues to be improved thanks to the co-partnership between the community and the editor.

=== Timeline ===
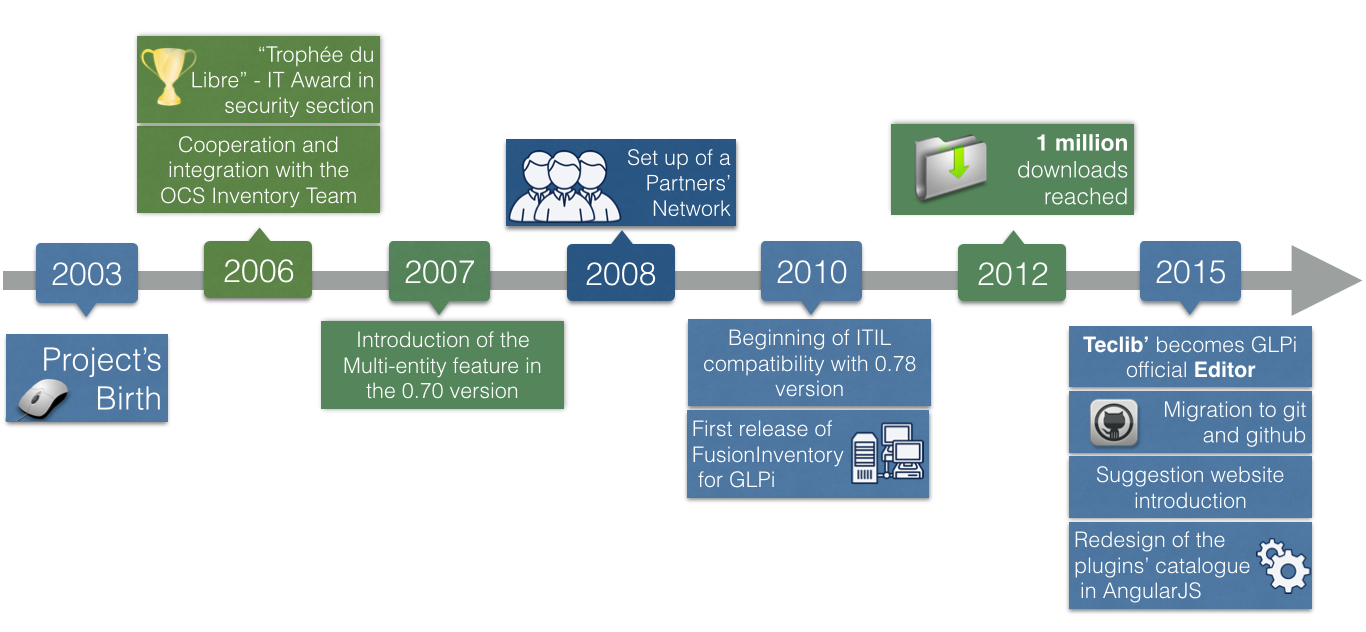

== Software development ==
GLPI Project is an open source and collaborative community of developers and IT experts gathered to develop the GLPI software. This collaboration is achieved by different means: installation and use of GLPI, GLPI tests, upgrades submissions, documentation participations, translations, features request.

=== Major releases ===
Since 2003, GLPI has been developed through more than 80 versions. Major releases include:

Date	Release
October 7th, 2026	GLPI 12.0.0
October 1st, 2025	GLPI 11.0.0
April 20th, 2022	GLPI 10.0.0
July 7th, 2020	GLPI 9.5.0
February 11th, 2019	GLPI 9.4.0
June 28th, 2018	GLPI 9.3
September 25th, 2017	GLPI 9.2
September 23rd, 2016	GLPI 9.1
October 9, 2015	GLPI 0.90
November 12, 2014	GLPI 0.85
August 9, 2013	GLPI 0.84
April 4, 2012	GLPI 0.83
May 26, 2011	GLPI 0.80
October 12, 2010	GLPI 0.78
July 15, 2009	GLPI 0.72
July 11, 2008	GLPI 0.71
December 21, 2007	GLPI 0.70
July 28, 2006	GLPI 0.68
March 29, 2006	GLPI 0.65
September 20, 2005	GLPI 0.6
April 29, 2005	GLPI 0.5
November 17, 2003	GLPI 0.2 – 1st Version

== Software overview ==
As an ITSM software, the main features of GLPI are the following:

- Multi-entity management
- Multilingual management and support (45 languages available)
- Multi user support and Multiple Authentication System
- Administrative and Financial management
- Inventory functionalities
- Incident and request management tracking and monitoring features
- Problem and change management
- Licenses management (ITIL compliant)
- Assignment of equipment: location, users and groups
- Simplified interface to allow end users to fill a support ticket
- Asset and helpdesk reports: hardware, network or interventions (support)

== Specific features ==
Features	Characteristics
Inventory	Inventory of computers, peripherals network printers and associated components through an interface with OCS Inventory or FusionInventory
Inventory	Business management, contracts, documents related to inventory items
ITIL Compliant ServiceDesk	Management of issues on many environments through creation of tickets, management of tickets, assignment, tickets scheduling, etc.
ITIL Compliant ServiceDesk	Problem, project and changes management
End Users	Intervention history
End Users	Satisfaction survey
End Users	Request comment
End Users	Mail tracking of intervention demands
Technicians	Intervention demands management
Technicians	Ticket escalation
Statistics	Reports in various formats (PNG, SVG, CSV)
Statistics	Global statistics
Statistics	Categories statistics (by technician, hardware, user, category, priority, location …)
Management	Equipment status management and booking
Management	Contracts and Documents management
Management	Basic system of knowledge database management
Management	Management of applications for assistance of all types of equipment inventory
Management	Management of business and financial information (purchase, guarantee and extension, damping)
Reservation	Reservation management
Reservation	User interface (calendar)
Knowledge Database	Knowledge base articles and FAQ management
Knowledge Database	Content management by targets (profiles, groups, etc.)
Reports	Devices Report generation (device-type, associated contract, commercial information)
Projects	Manage projects. You can associate users, groups, companies, Assets, contacts. documents, contracts and items. They will be used for the creation of tasks linked to the project. You can create sub-projects and associate them to a parent project. The projects it is available as Gantt type trees and graphics.

Moreover, GLPI has many plugins that add further features.

== Distribution ==
GLPI Software can be installed and set up in two different ways, either through the community forge or through a professional network.

== Technologies used ==
GLPI is using the following technologies:

- PHP 7.4 or higher
- MySQL / MariaDB regarding the database
- HTML for the Web pages
- JavaScript for some core functionalities
- CSS respecting style sheets
- XML for report generation

== See also ==
- IT asset management
- Issue tracking system
- Comparison of help desk issue tracking software
- Comparison of ticket-tracking systems
- Service desk
- OCS Inventory
