= FogBugz =

Integrated web-based project management system

- Original author: Fog Creek Software
- Developer: IgniteTech
- Initial release: November 2000; 25 years ago
- Operating system: Cross-platform
- Type: Project management software, Bug tracking system
- License: Proprietary
- Website: www.fogbugz.com

FogBugz is an integrated web-based project management system featuring bug and issue tracking, discussion forums, wikis, customer relationship management, and evidence-based scheduling originally developed by Fog Creek Software.

== History ==
FogBugz was re-branded as Manuscript at the end of 2017.

On August 3, 2018 Manuscript was acquired by DevFactory. They renamed it back to FogBugz.
