= GitKraken =

American software company

- Formerly: Axosoft
- Type: Computer software
- Industry: Technology
- Founded: 2000
- Founder: Hamid Shojaee
- Headquarters: Scottsdale, Arizona, U.S.
- Parent: Resurgens Technology Partners
- Website: gitkraken.com

GitKraken (formerly Axosoft) is a software company based in Scottsdale, Arizona. Founded in 2002, the company was purchased in 2020 by Resurgens Technology Partners, and changed its name from Axosoft to GitKraken in 2021.

== GitKraken ==
GitKraken
- Developer: GitKraken
- Stable release: 12.1.1 / May 7, 2026; 5 months ago
- Operating system: Cross-platform
- Type: Git client
- License: Proprietary
- Website: gitkraken.com

The company's eponymous proprietary product GitKraken encompasses a wide range of DevEx tools. The GitKraken DevEx platform includes tools like: GitKraken Git GUI, a Git client available on Mac, Windows, and Linux, GitLens for VS Code, Git Integration for Jira, GitKraken.dev, GitKraken Browser Extension, and more.

== Axosoft ==
Axosoft
- Developer: GitKraken
- Release: 2002; 24 years ago
- Stable release: 20.0.1 / May 16, 2020; 6 years ago
- Written in: C#
- Operating system: Cross-platform
- Type: Bug tracking system, Project management software
- License: Proprietary
- Website: axosoft.com

The Axosoft (formerly OnTime) product is a proprietary project management and bug tracking system developed by GitKraken.

The system is available as hosted or on-premises software. The software allows project managers and developers to see each task, requirement, defect and incident in the system on individual filing cards through the Scrum planning board. Axosoft operates as a web application and can integrate with Microsoft Visual Studio and TortoiseSVN.
