= SysAid Technologies =

Israeli IT service management software company

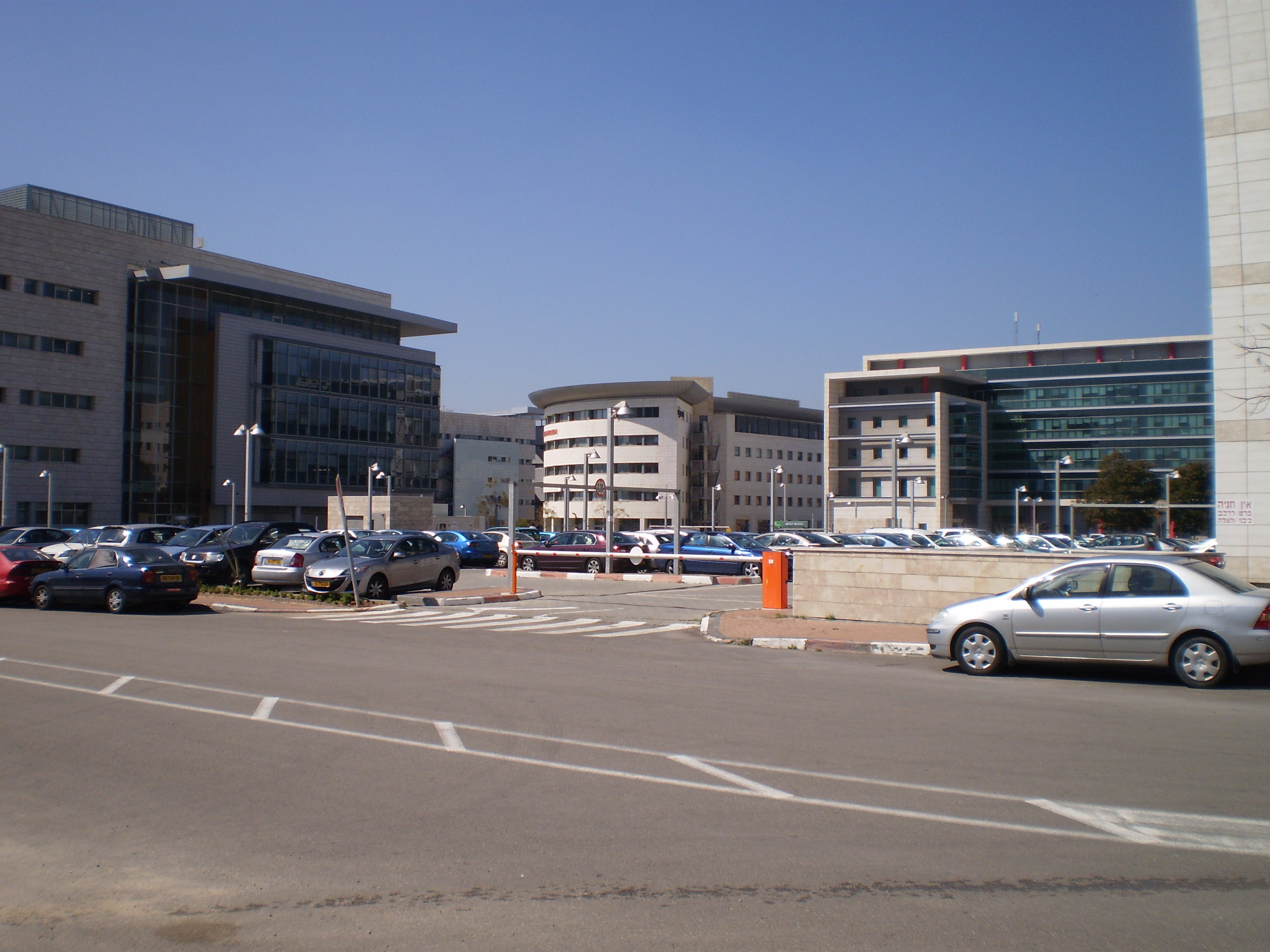
- SysAid headquarters at Airport City business park in Lod
- Formerly: Ilient
- Company type: Private
- Industry: Information technology
- Founded: 2002; 24 years ago
- Founder: Israel Lifshitz
- Headquarters: Tel Aviv, Israel
- Key people: Avi Kedmi (CEO)
- Products: SysAid, an all-in-one IT Help Desk software
- Website: www.sysaid.com

SysAid Technologies (formerly Ilient) is an Israeli company that develops and provides IT Service Management software. Its main product is a IT help desk software system.

SysAid Technologies is a privately owned company, founded in 2002 by Israel Lifshitz who was also the founder of NUBO Software. The corporate headquarters are located in Airport City, Israel, near Tel Aviv.

== History ==
The company was founded by Israel Lifshitz in 2002.

In June 2010, the company opened an additional office in Sydney, Australia. In May 2012, it opened another office in Brazil, South America.

By 2011, SysAid products were used in more than 100,000 organizations worldwide in numerous industries, including: healthcare, retail, education, financial services, manufacturing, aviation, and food/beverages.

== See also ==
- Comparison of issue tracking systems
- Comparison of help desk issue tracking software
