= Tuleap =

Application lifecycle management system

- Stable release: 17.5 / April 2026; 7 months ago
- Written in: PHP
- Type: Application lifecycle management
- License: GPL-2.0-or-later, with some non-GPL dependencies
- Website: www.tuleap.org
- Repository: tuleap.net/plugins/git/tuleap/tuleap/stable

Tuleap is an application lifecycle management system which focuses on agile software development while supporting other approaches towards project management developed and maintained by Enalean, a French tech company founded in 2011 and headquartered in France. It is open source, released under the GNU General Public License, version 2, and aims to rival proprietary tools like CollabNet, Jira and Confluence (and the Atlassian Suite), and Crucible.

== Features ==
Tuleap is a software platform for project management that supports various development methodologies including Agile, V-model, traditional or hybrid or custom processes. It helps organizations meet project management standards such as Capability Maturity Model Integration (CMMI) and ITIL. Tuleap facilitates the planning of software releases, the prioritization of business requirements, the assignment of tasks to project members, the monitoring of project progress, requirements management, IT service management, and the creation of reports. It provides site-wide trackers and real-time reports on risks, requirements, tasks, bugs, change requests, support requests, and user stories. It supports Kanban, Scrum, and hybrid methodologies in lean manufacturing. Tuleap has a built-in risk management system.

Tuleap integrates forge system functionalities to manage software sources using Subversion, Git or CVS. Teams are able to share technical or project documentations, track bugs, and centralize communications with internal and external parties.

== Reception ==
In 2018, Opensource.com named Tuleap one of the top 7 open source tools for Agile Teams. It also named it one of the top 5 open source project management tools in 2015.

InfoWorld magazine awarded it the "Best Open Source Application Development Tools" (the Bossie Awards) in 2013.

Tuleap is used by Fortune 500 companies, small and medium enterprises, and open source projects. Notable users include: Airbus, the French Alternative Energies and Atomic Energy Commission (CEA), DSI of Grenoble University, Eclipse Foundation, and the Ministry of Electronics and Information Technology of India,
