= Tracker (business software) =

- Developer: Automation Centre
- Stable release: 7.0 (8/2023) [±]
- Type: Enterprise Software
- Website: acentre.com

Tracker is a family of business software products developed by Automation Centre. Each product includes applications for various business processes. While these products share a similar process framework, they differ in platform deployment.

== Products ==
The Tracker family includes Tracker Suite, TrackerOffice, and TrackerSuite.Net. Tracker Suite and TrackerOffice are groupware, utilizing the Lotus Notes and Microsoft Outlook email systems, respectively.

TrackerSuite.Net is a web application, although it also utilizes email for functions such as notifications and reminders. It is considered a cloud computing application, as it can be configured to interact with software as a service solutions such as QuickBooks Online Edition. TrackerSuite.Net also integrates with email systems, including Lotus Notes and Microsoft Outlook.

Each Tracker product includes modular applications for typical business divisions including project management, information technology management, human resources and sales. However, the business modules available in each package differ. Similar applications also vary in terms of features offered. For example, the personnel management module in TrackerOffice does not offer as many functions and tools as the same module in Tracker Suite and TrackerSuite.Net.

== See also ==
- Project management software
- List of project management software
- Help Desk
- Comparison of time tracking software
- Comparison of help desk issue tracking software
