= Application Lifecycle Framework =

Eclipse Application Lifecycle Framework
- Developer: Eclipse Foundation
- Type: Application Lifecycle Management
- License: Eclipse Public License
- Website: eclipse.org/alf

The Application Lifecycle Framework (ALF) was a project by the Eclipse Foundation that aimed to create a standardized, open-source system to allow different application lifecycle management (ALM) tools to work together more easily. The goal was to provide common protocols and integration services that would let software development tools from different vendors communicate and share data. However, the project failed to gain sufficient support from major industry players and was terminated in 2008.

== See also ==
- ISO/IEC 12207, this is an international standard for software lifecycle processes
