= Twproject =

Web-based project and groupware management tool

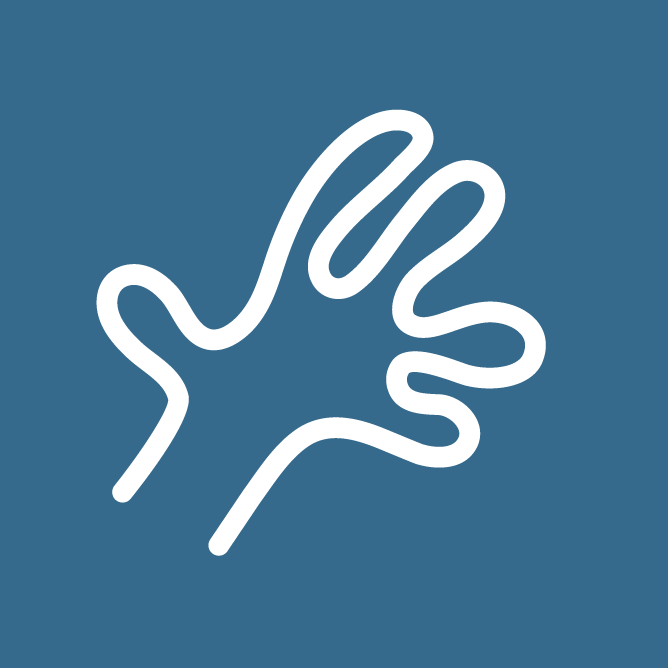
- Twproject registered logo

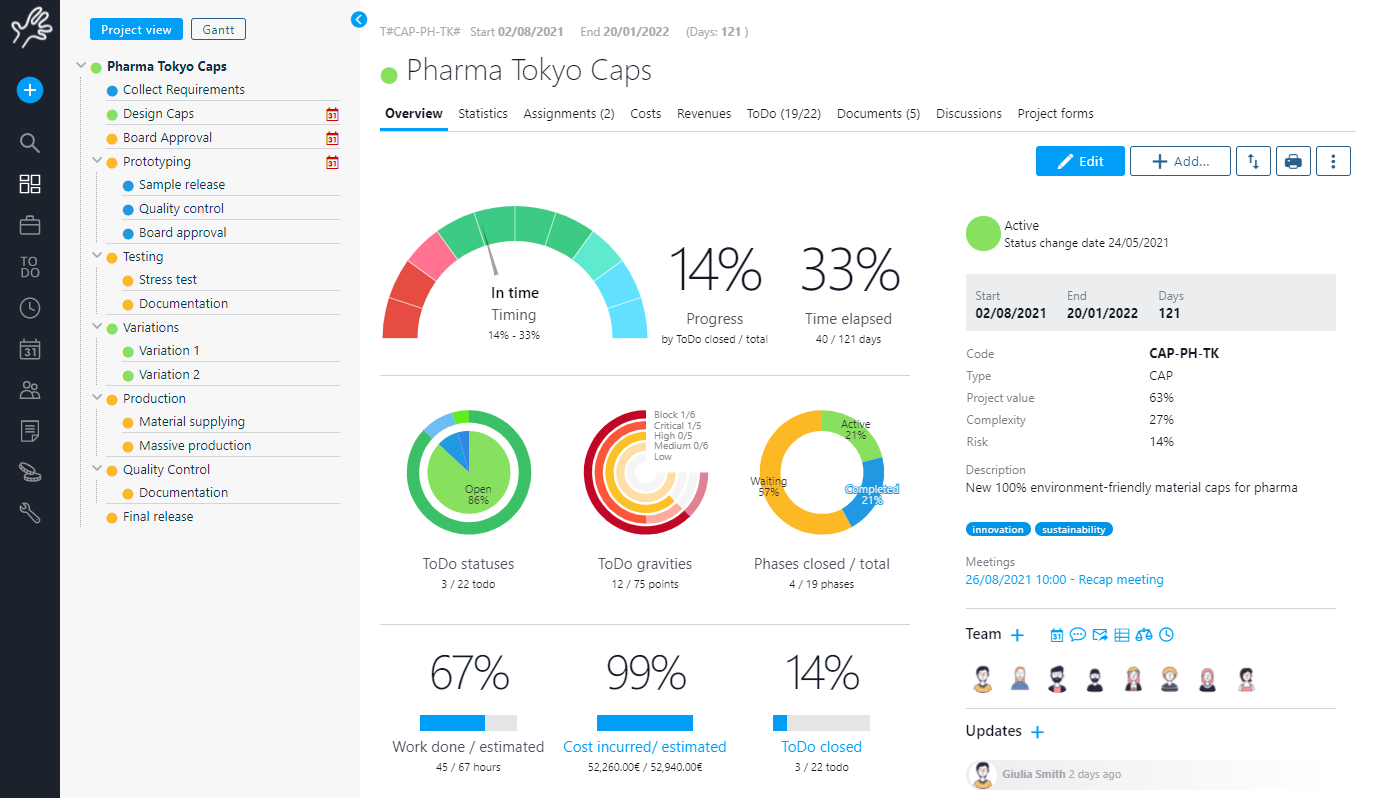
- Twproject project overview page with WBS & statistics
- Developer: Twproject srl
- Release: April 2001
- Operating system: Cross-platform
- Type: Project management software
- License: Proprietary
- Website: twproject.com

Twproject (say: T W Project) is a web-based project and groupware management tool created by Open Lab, an Italian software house founded in 2001. It won the 17th Jolt Productivity Award in 2007 in the project management category. In March 2019 it becomes property of Twproject company. It has widespread use in universities as a teaching tool in project management courses. It is used by Oracle Corporation, Prada, Calzedonia, General Electric and many other companies from corporations to small start-ups.

== History ==
- April 2001 - The idea of Teamwork came to Open-Lab founders from a need to overcome the PM tools used at that time. It was built in Microsoft ASP and Adobe Flash
- November 2002 - Open-Lab decide to move from Flash to HTML and from ASP to Java-JSP. Teamwork 2 development is started.
- June 2004 - Teamwork 2 released, using top open-source technologies like Hibernate, jBlooming, dynamic CSS, Ajax
- 7 January 2005 - Teamwork goes open source, under LGPL license; remains such until June 2006 (18 months): it is a hit application on SourceForge, with 38.000 downloads, covered by greeting but starving
- April 2005 - Open-Lab takes the decision to change commercial strategy to finance development of Teamwork version 3
- 6 June 2006 - Teamwork 3 is finally out (15 months development). New interface, many new features, agile support and much more
- 27 March 2007 - Teamwork wins the 2007 JOLT Productivity Awards for project management category
- July 2007 - Teamwork 4 development started: new interface, extended use of new HTML capabilities, JS-oriented interface, start using jQuery
- February 2009 - Teamwork 4.0 is out
- February 2010 - Teamwork 4.4: public project pages, Chinese interface. jQuery is getting more space in Teamwork
- December 2010 - Teamwork 4.6: released Mobile module available for iPhone, Android, BlackBerry. Intensive usage of jQuery
- June 2011 - Teamwork 4.7: released Issue Kanban / Organizer
- January 2012 - Teamwork 5.0 development started. Lighter interface, extensive usage of dynamic pages, easier installer and first time approach. Learning curve highly reduced. A jQuery Gantt editor included and released free for the community
- July 2012 - Teamwork 5 released and also the free online Gantt editor
- November 2012 - Teamwork 5.1 with new trees and improved model for staffing
- March 2013 - Teamwork 5.2 with stronger support for customizations and Japanese interface.
- April 2014 - Teamwork has changed its name in Twproject because the domain teamwork.com has been purchased by Teamwork.
- April 2013 - Twproject 5.4 with a redesigned more powerful Gantt chart.
- August 2015 - Twproject 5 finale release.
- September 2015 - Twproject 6 with a completely redesigned user interface.
- March 2019 - A new company Twproject srl has been spun off.
- September 2021 - Twproject 7 has been released introducing WBS based management and workload management.

== Features ==
- Project & task management (with Microsoft Project import/export), and JSON format
- Gantt editor. Uses jQuery Gantt components
- Time tracking. Several entry points: dashboard, weekly view, issues, start/stop buttons
- Resource planning with weekly/monthly view, work load overview, unavailability from agenda
- Issue tracking & planning(with Kanban), e-mail integration, task dedicated inboxes
- Dashboard configuration, with customizable portlets and layout
- Message boards
- Scrum module
- Meeting and minute management, attached documents
- Agenda (Integrates with iCal, Microsoft Outlook, Microsoft Entourage, and Google Calendar)
- Document management, remote file systems link with NTFS, FTP, SVN, S3 (Dropbox, Google drive)
- Mobile application for iPhone, iPad, Android, Blackberry, Windows phone

== Integration ==
A complete JSON API is available for integrations. The applications runs in Java JDK 8+ on the Hibernate object/relational mapping.

The standard distribution uses Apache Tomcat 9, but can run on any J2EE application server. Twproject is tested on these DB servers: MySQL, Oracle, SQL Server, PostgreSql, HSQLDB, but as uses Hibernate can run on many others. There is simple graphical step-by-step installer for Windows, Mac, Linux, .zip/.tar.gz/.rpm packages.

== See also ==
- Comparison of time-tracking software
- Comparison of project-management software
