= OpenText ALM =

Software suite

OpenText AQM
- Stable release: 26.1
- Operating system: Microsoft Windows
- Type: application lifecycle management tools, application quality tools, application testing tools
- License: Proprietary
- Website: Open Text AQM product page

OpenText AQM (Application Quality Management), formerly known as Application Lifecycle Management (ALM), is a software suite used in application development and management. It includes modules for planning, development, testing, deployment, and maintenance. OpenText AQM is a software suite for application development and testing. It is developed and marketed by OpenText—the product was previously owned by Micro Focus, Hewlett Packard Enterprise, Hewlett-Packard, and Mercury Interactive. It includes tools for requirements management, test planning and functional testing, performance testing (when used with Performance Center), developer management (through integration with developer environments such as Collabnet, TeamForge and Microsoft Visual Studio), and defect management.

AQM is a platform holding several key applications and a dashboard used for managing the core lifecycle of applications. These are connected with a common management console and layer of project tracking and planning, with a supported SDK.

AQM is intended to provide Information Technology departments with a centralized application management platform for managing and automating within and across application teams and throughout the complete process of developing an application, within a single workflow.

== Components ==
=== Project planning and tracking ===
AQM includes features for project planning and tracking, allowing development teams to define milestones and monitor progress using performance indicators.

=== Application lifecycle intelligence ===
Real-time traceability of requirements and defects.

=== Lab management automation ===
The Lab Management module supports provisioning of test environments across hybrid infrastructures, including physical servers, virtual machines, on-premises systems, and cloud platforms, through integration with Continuous Delivery Automation (CDA)

=== Asset sharing and re-use ===
ALM supports sharable asset libraries that can be reused across projects while maintaining traceability. Specific changes can be applied to shared assets for each project while maintaining library integrity, and projects can re-synch with the library as needed. Cross-project defect collaboration is also supported.

=== Cross-project reporting ===
ALM provides cross-project reporting and pre-configured business views for reports such as aggregated project status metrics, application quality metrics, requirements coverage, and defect trends for both an enterprise release and individual projects.

=== Performance and load testing ===
OpenText LoadRunner Enterprise (formerly known as Performance Center) is a performance testing platform and framework. The platform is used by IT departments to standardize, centralize and conduct performance testing, as well as reuse previous test cases. LoadRunner Enterprise was integrated with ALM (versions 12.6x and prior), but these have now been decoupled and are considered two separate products.

=== Quality assurance ===
AQM includes quality assurance features for risk-based test planning and management, version control, baselining, quality release and cycle management, test scheduling and execution, integrated manual testing and defect management.

OpenText Quality Center is a quality management platform that can be used for a single project or across multiple IT projects to manage application quality across the entire application lifecycle. The platform provides requirements management, release and cycle management, test management, defect management and reporting from a single platform.

=== Requirements definition and management ===
AQM is used by IT departments to capture, manage and track requirements throughout the application development and testing cycle.

=== Fortify security ===
Fortify is an application security suite now part of OpenText's Application Security portfolio. It offers static application security testing (SAST), dynamic application security testing (DAST), and tools for integrating security testing into development workflows.

Earlier releases of AQM included features intended to support integration with Fortify, but according to recent release notes, AQM support in Fortify Software Security Center is deprecated in version 25.4.0, and will be removed in version 26.2.0.

=== Multi-environment support ===
AQM can be installed on-site or delivered through the cloud in a software as a service model. ALM is also available for mobile device support, including Apple iPhone and Android mobile devices.

== See also ==
- Application lifecycle management
