= OTRS =

Service management software

- Original author: Martin Edenhofer
- Developer: OTRS AG
- Release: 2001; 25 years ago
- Stable release: 8
- Written in: Perl/JavaScript
- Platform: Multi-platform
- Type: Service Management, Help Desk
- License: proprietary until version 6.0: GPL
- Website: otrs.com
- Repository: No longer available

OTRS (originally Open-Source Ticket Request System) is a service management suite. The suite contains an agent portal, admin dashboard and customer portal. In the agent portal, teams process tickets and requests from customers (internal or external). There are various ways in which this information, as well as customer and related data can be viewed. As the name implies, the admin dashboard allows system administrators to manage the system: Options are many, but include roles and groups, process automation, channel integration, and CMDB/database options. The third component, the customer portal, is much like a customizable webpage where information can be shared with customers and requests can be tracked on the customer side.

== History ==
In 2001, OTRS began as an open source help desk ticketing software.

In 2003, OTRS GmbH was formed and a professional company entered the EMEA market. This was followed in 2006 by entry into the North American market.

In 2007, the company was renamed to OTRS AG with the intention of going public, which it did in 2009. This is the same year in which OTRS was brought to Latin America with the Mexican subsidiary officially being founded in 2010. Entry into the APAC region occurred in 2011.

In 2015, a new version of the software, known as OTRS Business Solution, was launched. This proprietary version was designed for professional users who needed additional support, configuration and features.

In 2018, both OTRS-specific products were renamed: The open source version became ((OTRS)) Community Edition. The proprietary and managed version is named OTRS. A third offering, also proprietary, is called OTRS On-Premise for professional customers who intend to host the platform in their own data centers.

In December 2020, OTRS AG announced the end of life of support for the Community Edition which led to several forks. Alongside its customers was Wikimedia Foundation, which used ((OTRS)) Community Edition to run Wikimedia OTRS system; after its discontinuation, in April 2021, it was migrated to Znuny, a fork of ((OTRS)) Community Edition. Being no longer run on original OTRS software, the system was renamed Wikimedia VRT.

In December 2024, the French company EasyVista acquired a majority stake in OTRS AG.

== OTRS Group ==
OTRS GmbH was originally founded in 2003 by André Mindermann (CEO) and Burchard Steinbild (chairman of the supervisory board). In 2007, the company became OTRS Group, also known as OTRS AG. In addition to the two, today's management board includes Christopher Kuhn (COO), Sabine Riedel (board member, Marketing, HR), Gabriele Brauer (VP Finance) and Manuel Hecht (VP Global Software Development).

OTRS AG is the source code owner of OTRS.

The OTRS Group has its headquarters in Germany. There are six subsidiaries worldwide, including OTRS Inc. (USA), OTRS S.A. de C.V. (Mexico), OTRS ASIA Pte. Ltd. (Singapore), OTRS Asia Ltd. (Hong Kong), OTRS Do Brasil Soluções Ltda. (Brazil), and OTRS Magyarország Kft. (Hungary).

OTRS AG is listed in the Basic Board of the Frankfurt Stock Exchange.

== Technical notes ==
Since its beginnings OTRS has been implemented in the programming language Perl. The web interface is made user-friendly by using JavaScript (which can be switched off for security reasons). The OTRS web interface uses the Template::Toolkit rendering engine to dynamically generate the HTML output of individual frontend modules. This approach allows the underlying logic of the OTRS frontend modules (written in Perl) to remain separate from the presentation of each module's user interface (served as HTML to the user).

Originally, OTRS supported only the use of a MySQL RDBMS for use as the webserver database. Support has since been added for PostgreSQL, Oracle, IBM Db2, Microsoft SQL Server, and MariaDB (a community-developed fork of MySQL). OTRS may be used on many UNIX or UNIX-like platforms (e.g. Linux, macOS, FreeBSD, etc.) as well as on Microsoft Windows.

The scalability of OTRS systems may be increased by using mod perl for the Apache Webserver or by separating the database and web server systems, allowing a large number of simultaneously working agents and high volumes of tickets.

== See also ==
- Comparison of help desk issue tracking software
- Comparison of issue-tracking systems
