= OpenText Quality Center =

Test management software

Quality Center
- Developer(s): OpenText
- Stable release: 17.0.1 / April 3, 2023; 2 years ago
- Operating system: Windows, Linux
- Type: Quality management/test management
- License: Proprietary
- Website: OpenText ALM/Quality Center

OpenText Quality Center, formerly known as Micro Focus Quality Center and HP Quality Center, is a quality management software offered by OpenText who acquired Micro Focus in 2023. Micro Focus acquired the software division of Hewlett Packard Enterprise in 2017, with many capabilities acquired from Mercury Interactive Corporation. Quality Center offers software quality assurance, including requirements management, test management and business process testing for IT and application environments. Quality Center is a component of the Micro Focus Application Lifecycle Management software set.

== Product packaging ==
Quality Center is available in the following editions:

- Community
- Express
- Enterprise

Community and Express editions are designed for entry-level software quality assurance organizations. The Enterprise edition, originally called Mercury TestDirector for Quality Center, is for software quality assurance organizations that manage medium to large releases. For large and global organizations, OpenText Application Lifecycle Management incorporates the capabilities of Quality Center enterprise tracking, enterprise release management and asset sharing for requirements management through application delivery. Quality Center is also available as a software-as-a-service offering.

== System requirements ==
Quality Center desktop client runs on the Windows platforms without the need of any browser. It also has a web client that runs on any browser.

OpenText has published information about ALM's server-side and client-side system requirements, updated periodically as new versions and patches are released.
