= StarTeam =

Version control system

OpenText StarTeam
- OpenText StarTeam Client
- Original authors: Starbase, Borland
- Developer: OpenText
- Initial release: 1995; 30 years ago
- Stable release: 17.0 / March 2019; 6 years ago
- Operating system: Microsoft Windows 10, Microsoft Windows 8, Microsoft Windows 7, Windows XP Professional SP3, Windows Vista SP1, Red Hat Enterprise Linux (WS) 5.1
- Available in: Multilingual
- Type: SCM
- License: Named and Concurrent End-user license options
- Website: www.microfocus.com/en-us/products/starteam/overview

StarTeam is a version control system used in software development, especially when a project involves multiple teams in different locations. StarTeam is an SCM and SDLC software application, created by Starbase Corporation, which was acquired by Borland in January 2003 which was acquired by Micro Focus in July 2009 and later acquired by OpenText in 2023. The application is client-server, backed by a relational database that retains all changes made to a project during its evolution as well as the project requirements, task assignments, threaded discussions and bug tracking. Microsoft SQL Server and Oracle database are supported database servers.

== Branching support ==
StarTeam supports branching and three-way merging, difference analysis, advanced user access and security management, checkpoints, end user and administrator auditing, view and revision labels, promotion states and customization features. The server supports remote use and strong encryption for remote connections. StarTeam allows "live" backups while the server is in active use and includes an optional publish/subscribe event system called StarTeam MPX to enhance scalability.

In addition to file versioning, StarTeam also stores requirements, project tasks, change requests, and discussions. All of these can be interlinked to enhance traceability within a project.

== Clients ==
StarTeam includes a number of clients, including a web client, a cross-platform Java client, a command line interface and integrations for popular Integrated development environments such as Borland Delphi, Borland JBuilder and Eclipse. StarTeam includes several APIs for platforms including COM, Java, and the Microsoft .NET Framework. It also provides an MSSCCI compliant Source Control Plug-in API for integration with IDEs that offer integrated revision control features as well as other applications such as Mercury Interactive's TestDirector and IBM Rational DOORS.

== Check-ins ==
All check-ins in StarTeam are atomic. Whenever more than one file is checked in as the result of a single transaction all of the files, and their associated process items, are updated in a single action. If for some reason, the check-in fails, none of the files are checked in, and the status of the associated process items is not updated. For example, suppose User A selects to check in all modified files in a StarTeam folder, but one of the selected files is locked by User B. Because of the locked file, none of the files are checked in (and none of the process items are updated as fixed) and User A is notified that none of the files were checked in because one of the files was locked by User B.

== See also ==
- DevPartner
- MySQL
- SilkTest
