= Jira (software) =

Issue-tracking product developed by Atlassian

- Developer: Atlassian
- Release: 2002; 24 years ago
- Stable release: 10.1.1 / 2024-10-09; 2025-05-30
- Written in: Java
- Operating system: Cross-platform
- Type: Bug tracking system, project management software
- License: Proprietary
- Website: www.atlassian.com/software/jira

Jira (/ˈdʒiːrə/ JEE-rə, formerly stylized JIRA) is a software product developed by Atlassian that allows bug tracking, issue tracking and agile project management. Jira is used by a large number of clients and users globally for project, time, requirements, task, bug, change, code, test, release, and sprint management.

== Naming ==
The product name comes from the last two syllables of Gojira, the Japanese name for Godzilla as well as the name of the 1998 version and suffix. The name originated from a nickname Atlassian developers used to refer to Bugzilla, which was previously used internally for bug-tracking.

== Description ==
According to Atlassian, Jira is used for issue tracking and project management. Some of the organizations that have used Jira at some point in time for bug-tracking and project management include Fedora Commons, Hibernate, and the Apache Software Foundation, which uses both Jira and Bugzilla. Jira includes tools allowing migration from competitor Bugzilla.

Jira is offered in three packages:

- Jira Software includes the base software, including agile project management features (previously a separate product: Jira Agile).
- Jira Service Management is intended for use by IT operations or business service desks.
- Jira Align is intended for strategic product and portfolio management.

Jira is written in Java and uses the Pico inversion of control container, Apache OFBiz entity engine, and WebWork 1 technology stack. For remote procedure calls (RPCs), Jira has REST, SOAP, and XML-RPC interfaces. Jira integrates with source control programs such as Clearcase, Concurrent Versions System (CVS), Git, Mercurial, Perforce, Subversion, and Team Foundation Server. It ships with various translations including English, French, German, Japanese, and Spanish.

Jira implements the Networked Help Desk API for sharing customer support tickets with other issue tracking systems.

== License ==
Jira is a commercial software product that can be licensed for running on-premises or available as a hosted application.

Atlassian provides Jira for free to open source projects meeting certain criteria, and to organizations that are non-academic, non-commercial, non-governmental, non-political, non-profit, and secular. The full source code is available for its users to modify under a developer source license.

== Security ==
In April 2010, a cross-site scripting vulnerability in Jira led to the compromise of two Apache Software Foundation servers. The Jira password database was also compromised. The database contained unsalted password hashes, which are vulnerable to rainbow attacks, dictionary lookups and cracking tools. Apache advised users to change their passwords. Atlassian themselves were also targeted as part of the same attack and admitted that a legacy database with passwords stored in plain text had been compromised.

== Evolution ==
When launched in 2002, Jira was purely issue tracking software, targeted at software developers. The app was later adopted by non-IT organizations as a project management tool. The process accelerated after the launch of Atlassian Marketplace in 2012, which allowed third-party developers to offer project management plugins for Jira. BigPicture, Scriptrunner, Advanced Roadmaps (formerly Portfolio), Structure, Tempo Planner, and ActivityTimeline are major project management plugins for Jira.

== Jira Service Management ==
Jira Service Management (JSM) was originally launched in 2013 as Jira Service Desk, targeting IT operations and business service desk use cases. In 2020, Atlassian rebranded and expanded the product as Jira Service Management, integrating incident management and on-call alerting functionality from Opsgenie, a company Atlassian had acquired in 2018. The rebrand also introduced capabilities aligned with the ITIL framework, including change management, problem management, and a configuration management database (CMDB).

Jira Service Management received PinkVERIFY ITIL 4 certification from Pink Elephant in 2023. This certification lapsed in 2024 after ITIL 4 tool certification processes transitioned from Pink Elephant to PeopleCert; as a result, the product no longer appears on Pink Elephant's certified-tool listings. Atlassian has stated it holds current ITIL 4 certification through PeopleCert's Accredited Tool Vendors program.

Jira Service Management integrates with other Atlassian products, including Jira Software, Confluence, and Statuspage. Beyond IT service management, it supports broader enterprise service management (ESM) applications, such as human resources and legal request handling.

== See also ==
- Comparison of issue-tracking systems
- Comparison of project management software
- List of collaborative software
