= Help desk =

Resource providing support for organization's products and services

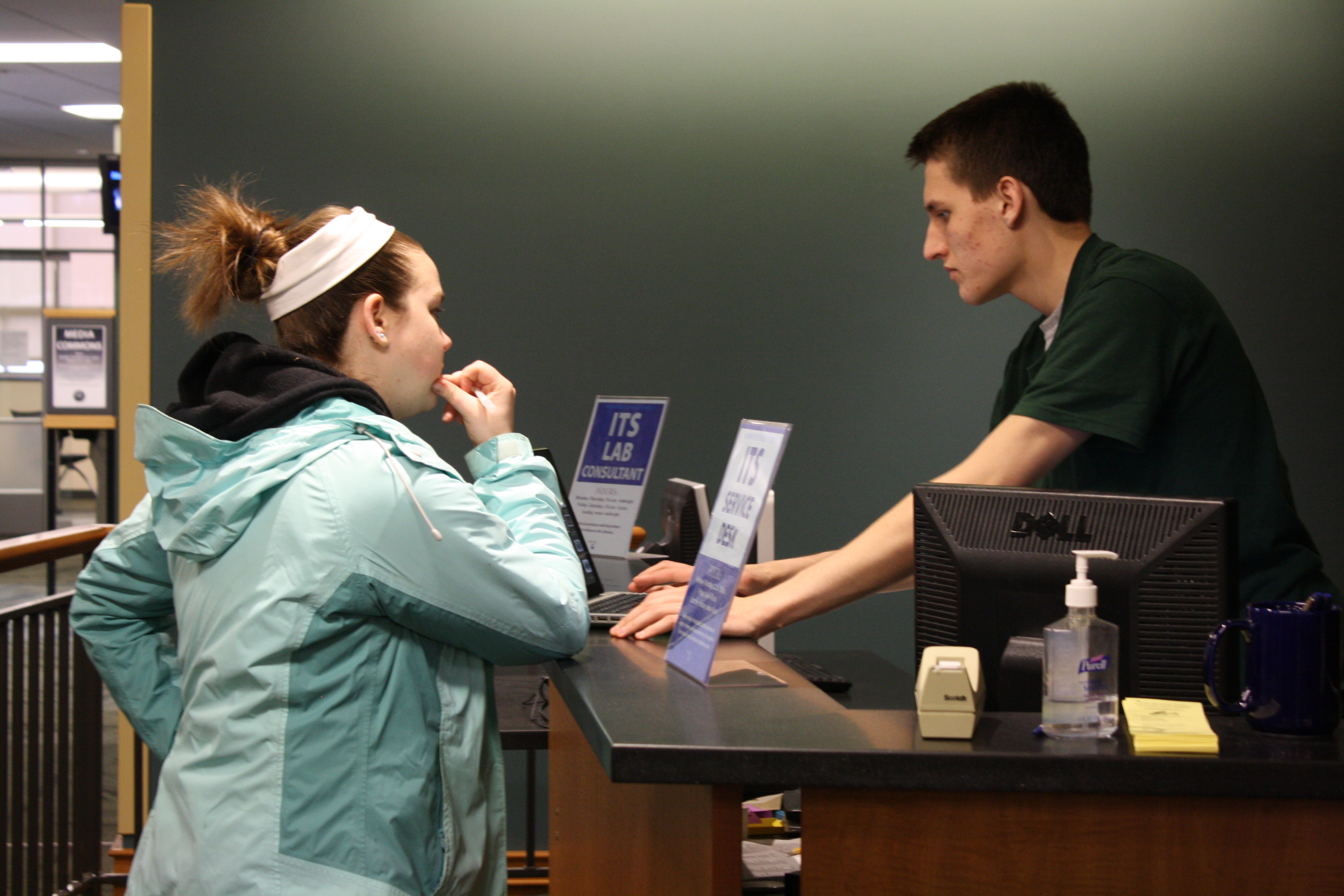
A help desk at Penn State University

A help desk is a department or person that provides assistance and information, usually for electronic or computer problems. Large help desks have a person or team responsible for managing the incoming requests, called "issues"; they are commonly called queue managers or queue supervisors. The queue manager is responsible for the issue queues, which can be set up in various ways depending on the help desk size or structure. Typically, large help desks have several teams that are experienced in working on different issues. The queue manager will assign an issue to one of the specialized teams based on the type of issue raised. Some help desks may have telephone systems with ACD splits ensuring that calls about specific topics are put through to analysts with the requisite experience or knowledge.

Help desks often use ticketing systems to document and track information technology (IT) problems reported by users. Tickets include details about the issue and which systems are affected. Tickets are prioritized based on urgency and impact. Technicians then troubleshoot the reported problems and may work with other support teams to resolve the issue. Before closing the ticket, technicians may check with the user to confirm the problem has been fixed. Helpdesk systems use AI knowledge base automation to resolve routine support tickets, reducing manual workload and improving resolution efficiency

== See also ==
- Service desk
- Call center
- Customer service
- Comparison of issue-tracking systems
- Comparison of help desk issue tracking software
- Technical support
- Help desk software
