= Support ticket =

Report for tracking a specific problem

A support ticket (also trouble ticket or incident ticket) or simply ticket is a running report on a particular problem, its status, and other relevant data for incidents that occur or concerns that arise within an organization, especially related to customer support. Tickets are generally used in collaborative settings, especially in large or distributed collaborations, but can also be employed by individuals as part of a time management or personal productivity regimen. Tickets often call for resource allocation, time accounting, priority management, and oversight workflow in addition to the desired response.

== Background ==
In an institutional setting, support tickets are commonly used in an organization's customer support call center to create, update, and resolve reported customer issues, or even issues reported by that organization's other employees. A support ticket generally includes vital information for the account involved and the issue encountered. A ticket-tracking system often also contains a knowledge base containing information on each customer, resolutions to common problems, and other such data.

Ticket-tracking systems are similar to bugtrackers, and often, a software company will sell both, and some bugtrackers are capable of being used as an issue tracking system, and vice versa. Consistent use of a ticket- or defect-tracking system is considered one of the "hallmarks of a good software team".

They are commonly created in a help desk or call center environment and almost always have a unique reference number, also known as a case, issue or call log number which is used to allow the user or help staff to quickly locate, add to or communicate the status of the user's issue or request.

These tickets are called so because of their origin as small cards within a traditional wall mounted work planning system when this kind of support started. Operators or staff receiving a call or query from a user would fill out a small card with the user's details and a brief summary of the request and place it into a position (usually the last) in a column of pending slots for an appropriate engineer, so determining the staff member who would deal with the query and the priority of the request.

The shared conceptual foundation between ticket-tracking systems and bugtrackers is that a valid issue must be amenable to a decisive resolution (such as "completed", "fixed", or a group consensus that the issue is not worth solving, such as "not a problem" or "won't fix"); that each issue is unique (duplicate problem reports are in most cases promptly amalgamated into a single active issue or ticket); and—beyond the screening stage—that there is precisely one person assigned formal responsibility to move the issue forward (this formal baton will often bounce around many times as the issue evolves). In bug trackers, issues are generally quality or feature related to the software codebase (which is inherently a project management setting) whereas in generalized ticket-tracking systems, the tickets are often service-related or relationship-based, with closer ties to customer relationship management (CRM) concerns.

== Incidents ==
Incidents can have several aspects to them that make them amenable to resolution with the use of an open ticket. Each ticket in the system may have an urgency value assigned to it, based on the overall importance of the issue. Low or zero urgency incidents are minor and should be resolved as time permits.

Other details of tickets used in incident response include the customer experiencing the issue (whether external or internal), date of submission, detailed descriptions of the problem being experienced, attempted solutions or workarounds, and other relevant information. Each ticket maintains a history of each change.

== Functions ==
Tickets support different functions, in particular:

- Entering of dysfunctions, errors and requests (e.g. manually or by e-mail Response Management Systems)
- Distribution and assignment of issues to persons in charge
- Monitoring of handling, time spent and quality of work
- Ensuring the observation of internal processes by forced control with help of workflows
- Statistical analysis of the number of tickets
- Automatic generation of tickets by alarming systems, e.g. network monitoring
- Fulfillment of external service agreements (Service Level Agreement, SLA)
- Systematic collection of questions and answers for FAQs
- Assignment of a priority to each issue based on the overall importance of that issue, the customer, date of submission, SLA
- Containing a detailed descriptions of the problem being experienced, attempted solutions or workarounds, and other relevant information
- Maintaining of a history of each change

== Workflow ==
An example scenario is presented to demonstrate how a support ticket is commonly opened and updated:

1. A customer service technician receives a telephone call, email, or other communication from a customer about a problem. Some applications provide built-in messaging system and automatic error reporting from exception handling blocks.
2. The technician verifies that the problem is real, and not just perceived. The technician will also ensure that enough information about the problem is obtained from the customer. This information generally includes the environment of the customer, when and how the issue occurs, and all other relevant circumstances.
3. The technician creates the ticket in the system, entering all relevant data, as provided by the customer.
4. As work is done on that issue, the ticket is updated with new data by the technician. Any attempt at fixing the problem should be noted. Ticket status most likely will be changed from open to pending.
5. After the issue has been fully addressed, it is marked as resolved in the ticket-tracking system.

If the problem is not fully resolved, the ticket will be reopened once the technician receives new information from the customer. A Run Book Automation process that implements best practices for these workflows and increases IT personnel effectiveness is becoming very common.

== Use in different sectors ==
=== Government ===
Some government services use ticket items to keep track of unresolved concerns and display them to the public. A ticket for a given concern may show all tasks still to be done by the government (in a waiting queue), finished tasks, tasks in progress, order sequence, etc. Finished tasks can also be foreseen with the report, showing what exactly has been done to address the issue.

For example, tickets may be used to track which legislative bills are up for voting and the outcome of them.

Transport and infrastructure issues (i.e. obstructions on roads, complains, ...) can also be filed as trouble tickets. The issues can then be tackled by the relevant government services.

== See also ==
- Help desk software
- Comparison of help desk issue tracking software
- Comparison of issue-tracking systems
- Climate Action Tracker
- Government by algorithm
- Issue log
- National Priorities List
- Suggestion box
- Open-source software development
- Prioritization
- Push–pull strategy
- Resource allocation
- User innovation
