= Conversable =

American e-commerce software company

Conversable Inc.
- Founded: 2015; 11 years ago in Austin, Texas, United States
- Founders: Ben Lamm; Andrew Busey
- Headquarters: 815-A Brazos Street, Suite 318, Austin, United States
- Number of locations: 2
- Area served: Worldwide
- Key people: Ben Lamm CEO; Andrew Busey CPO
- Number of employees: 39 (2018)
- Website: conversable.com

Conversable Inc. was a software company based in Austin, Texas and founded in 2015. It developed conversational commerce software. In 2018, it was acquired by LivePerson.

Some of companies using Conversable platform includes Budweiser, Wingstop, Pizza Hut, T.G.I. Friday's, Sam's Club, Shake Shack, CES, Whole Foods and 7-Eleven.

== History ==
In 2015, Conversable Inc. was founded by Ben Lamm, founder and CEO of digital creative design studio Chaotic Moon Studios, which was acquired by Accenture, and Andrew Busey, former CEO & co-founder of social game company Challenge Games Inc., which was acquired by Zynga. It received funding of $2 million from angel investors.

In March 2017, Conversable launched a new product called AQUA (Answer Questions Using AI), which is a business intelligence (BI) platform.

In 2018, Conversable was acquired by LivePerson to "help LivePerson continue to accelerate its goal of providing conversational commerce products to customers," according to CEO Robert LoCascio.

== Overview ==
It helps companies to deliver on-demand content, customer self-service, and conversational commerce via messaging channel and voice applications.

== Partnership ==
The company is partnered with Phobio in January, 2018. It is also partnered with Olo, Hinduja Global Solutions, Booz Allen Hamilton, Ernst & Young, Mindtree, WPP and Pactera.
