= Freshservice =

IT service management software

- Developer: Freshworks
- Release: 2014; 12 years ago
- Operating system: Web, Android, iOS
- Platform: SaaS
- Type: ITSM
- License: Proprietary
- Website: freshworks.com/freshservice/

Freshservice is an IT and enterprise service management platform developed by Freshworks in 2014. It offers software and hardware asset management, incident management, and service request tracking services. It is cloud-based and follows the Information Technology Infrastructure Library (ITIL) practises for IT service delivery.

Freshservice is available on web and mobile platforms. It's a subscription software and does not offer a free plan.

TechRadar and PCMag have included Freshservice among ITSM tools used by large organizations. As per SEC filings, the platform was being used by 8,900 clients in 2020.

In 2026, the software received FedRAMP In-Process certification.

== See also ==
- Help desk software
- Issue tracking system
