= Ben Lamm =

American entrepreneur (born 1981)

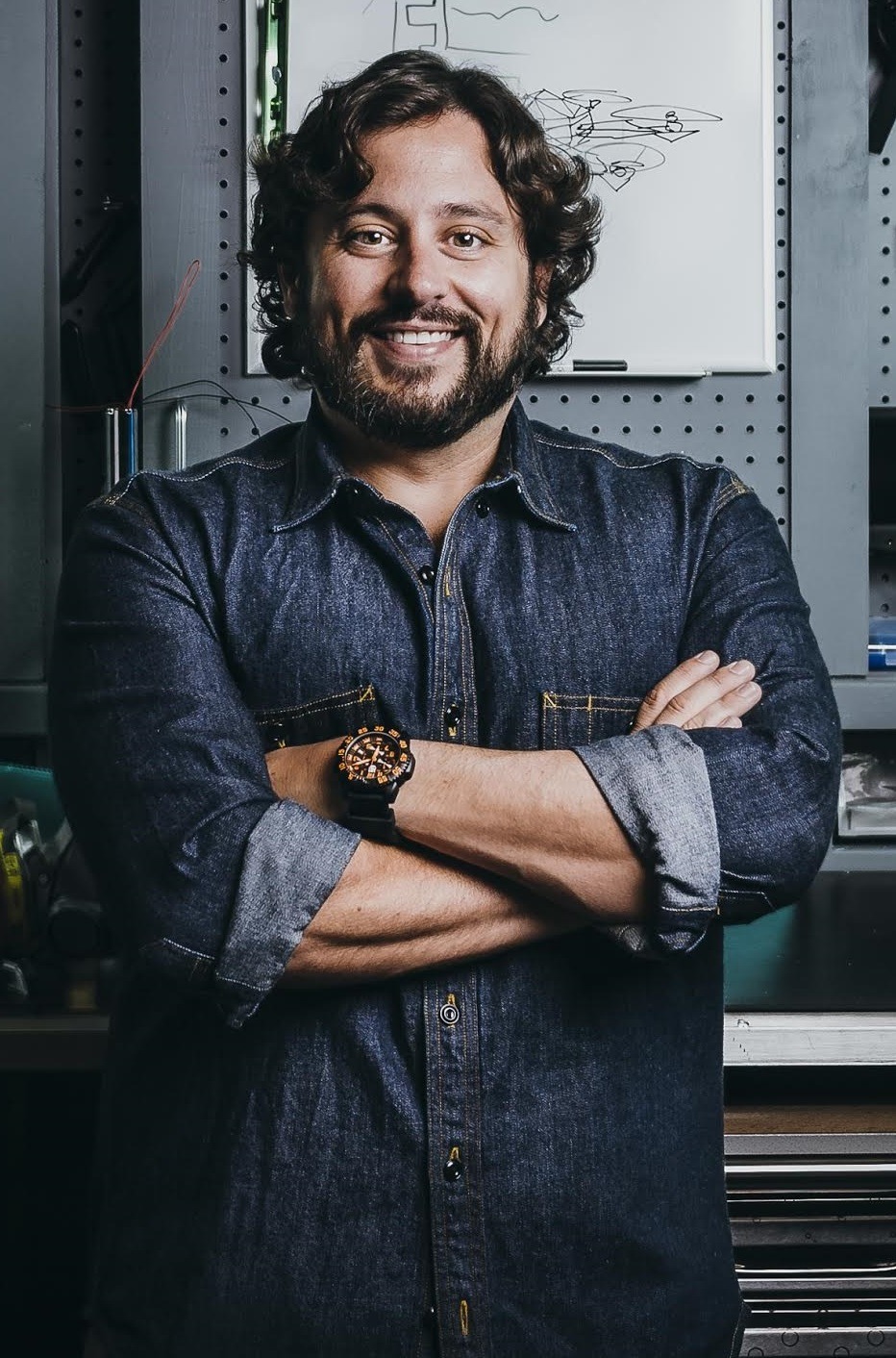
- Lamm in 2017
- Born: Benjamin Edward Lamm; December 4, 1981 (age 44); Austin, Texas, U.S.
- Education: Baylor University (BBA)
- Occupation: Entrepreneur
- Known for: Founding: Colossal Biosciences; Hypergiant Industries; Conversable; Chaotic Moon Studios; Astromech

Ben Lamm is an American billionaire entrepreneur. He is best known for partnering with George Church on the idea for de-extinction and founding a venture capital-backed startup known as Colossal to support Church's work in the development of genetic engineering and reproductive technology. As of 2026, his net worth is $5.7 billion.

== Career ==
Lamm founded his first company when he was a senior at Baylor University, where he later graduated with a Bachelor of Business Administration in finance and accounting in 2004.

He later sold ventures such as Simply Interactive, an e-learning software company (acquired by Agile in 2010); Chaotic Moon Studios, a mobile app company (acquired by Accenture in 2015); Team Chaos, a digital gaming company (acquired by Zynga in 2016); Conversable, a SaaS conversational bot technology (acquired by LivePerson in 2018); and Hypergiant Industries, a machine-learning artificial intelligence (acquired by Trive Capital in 2023), for undisclosed sums upon each company's acquisition.

At its launch in 2021, Lamm stated that Colossal would "bring back the woolly mammoth" within the next decade. Lamm secured investments from public figures such as Paris Hilton, Thomas Tull, Tom Brady, Peter Jackson, Chris Hemsworth, and Victor Vescovo and has raised more than $615 million as of March 2026 for a $10.32 billion valuation. He used $15 million in seed funding to apply genetic technology such as "clustered regularly interspaced short palindromic repeats" (CRISPR) for Colossal's work on conservation biology.

During the 2022 South by Southwest festival, Lamm was on a panel moderated by Richard Garriott that made the case for de-extinction.

In late 2022, Lamm co-founded Form Bio, a software company spun out of Colossal Biosciences. The company aims to develop software to improve the working efficiency of scientists. Form Bio was funded through a $30 million investment deal involving Thomas Tull.

Lamm launched Breaking, a plastic degradation and synthetic biology startup, in April 2024. Gestated at Colossal, Breaking discovered X-32, a microbe that is capable of breaking down various plastics in as little as 22 months while leaving behind carbon dioxide, water and biomass.

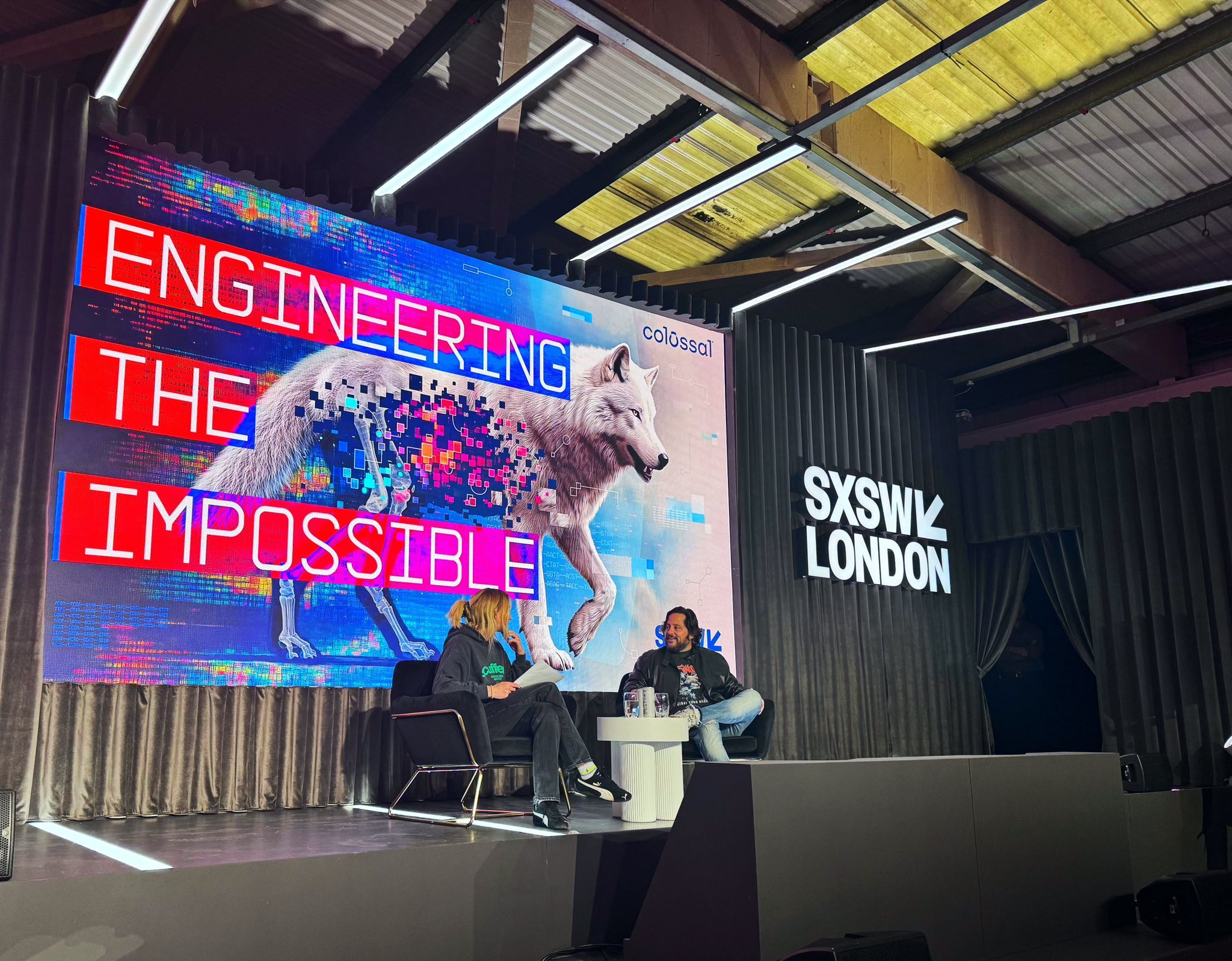
Lamm and Sophie Turner at SXSW London in June 2025.

He launched The Colossal Foundation, a 501(c)(3) that utilizes Colossal Biosciences-developed technology for conservative efforts globally, in October 2024. The Colossal BioVault is one of its key focuses. As of December 2025, the foundation has raised $100 million in total funding.

In April 2025, Lamm led his company's de-extinction work to "revive" the dire wolf. Romulus, Remus, and Khaleesi were announced publicly, and he appeared on The Joe Rogan Experience that same month to discuss the dire wolf.

Lamm was recognized on the 2025 Time 100 Next list.

In October 2026, Lamm and Palmer Luckey announced the founding of Warhound, a company that aims to create genetically engineered war dogs. The two also announced that they had already raised $200 million for the startup. According to WIRED, Lamm currently sits on the company board, and his company Colossal Biosciences has an ownership stake.

=== Astromech ===
Lamm founded Astromech, a startup developing a predictive engine using genomic data. It has operated in stealth mode since August 2025 with plans to become a warning system for evolution by "predicting where biological systems are going, identifying where biological systems may be vulnerable and why those changes could be happening" to forecast disease risk, drug resistance, food supply chain threats and system vulnerabilities.

Founders Lamm and George Church initially raised $30 million in funding and closed an additional $10.5 million in March 2026, valuing the Delaware-incorporated company at $2 billion. In August 2026, Astromech's valuation nearly doubled to $3.8 billion after $20 million in further funding to expand its research team and scale how it trains its AI models. The company's first model is working to generate hypotheses for the biological sources of longevity, having mapped 46 genes for cellular maintenance and cancer resistance to date.

The company's name is a reference to Astromech droids in Star Wars.

== Board and advisory work ==
Lamm is on the board of directors for the National Fish and Wildlife Foundation. He is a fellow and on the board of trustees for The Explorers Club. In June 2026, Lamm joined the UAP Science Advisory Council, a newly formed board that includes experts in physical sciences as well as psychology and biology.
