= Temple College =

Community college in Temple, Texas, U.S.

Coordinates: 31.07205°N 97.35172°W

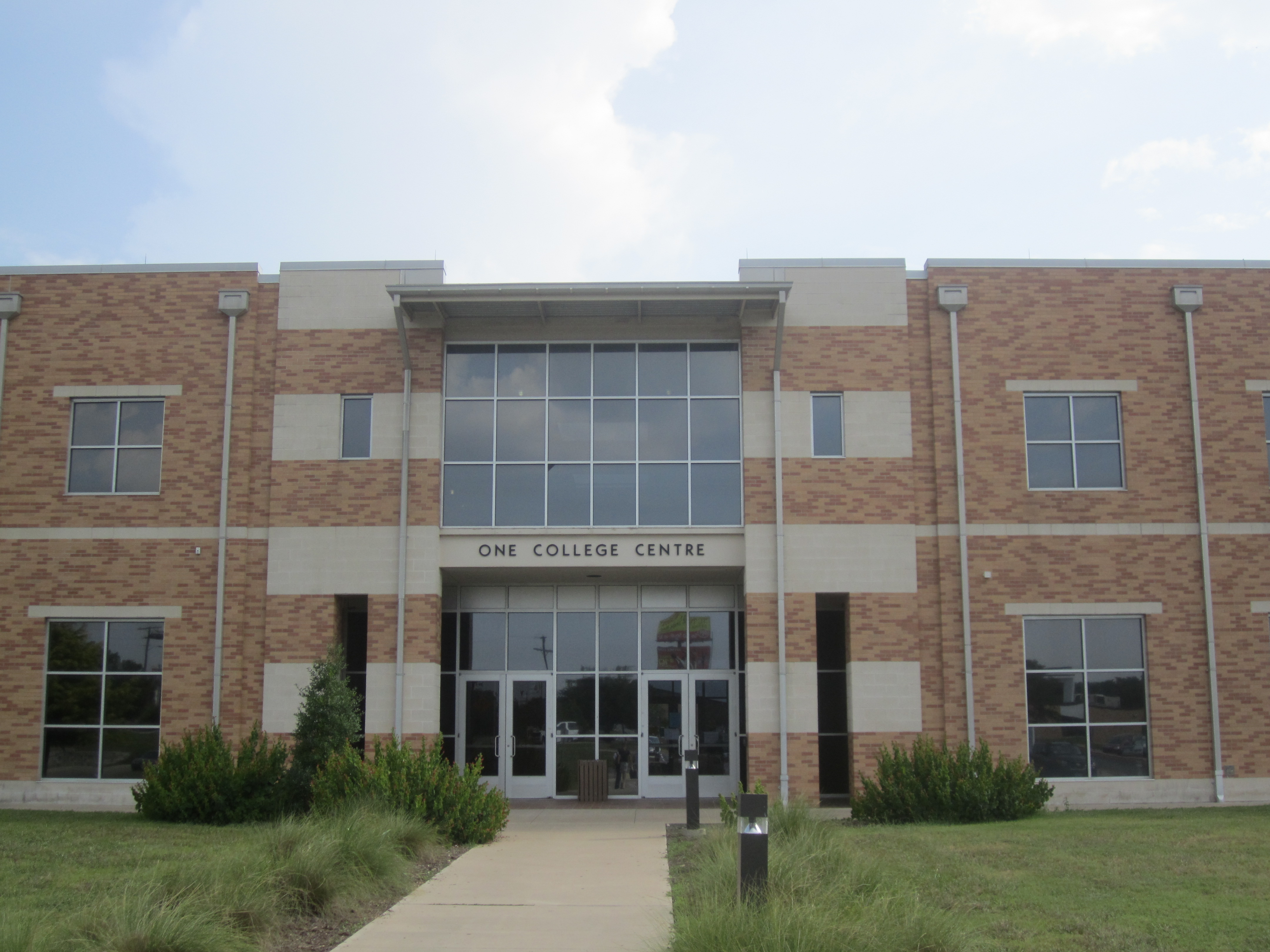
- One College Centre
- Former name: Temple Junior College
- Type: Public community college
- Established: 1926
- Accreditation: SACSCOC
- President: Christina Ponce
- Students: 5,400 (fall 2024)
- Location: Temple, Texas, United States
- Colors: Black and gold
- Nickname: Leopards
- Sporting affiliations: Northern Texas Junior College Athletic Conference
- Website: www.templecollege.edu

Temple College is a public community college in Temple, Texas, with regional branch campuses at other locations in Central Texas.

== History ==
Temple Junior College was founded in 1926 to serve post-secondary students in eastern Bell County, Texas. Classes were originally held in the basement of the Temple High School until 1957, when the campus moved to its present location on the city's south side. Racial segregation at the college ended that same year. A separate junior college district was created in 1955 and in 1959 it acquired its own board of regents. The name of the college was changed to Temple College in 1996.

The main campus in Temple covers about 108 acres with twenty-seven buildings. Temple College has several branch campuses:

- East Williamson County Higher Education–Taylor (Taylor, Texas)
- East Williamson County Higher Education–Hutto (Hutto, Texas)
- Texas Bioscience Institute (Scott & White Memorial Hospital, Temple)

== Gallery ==
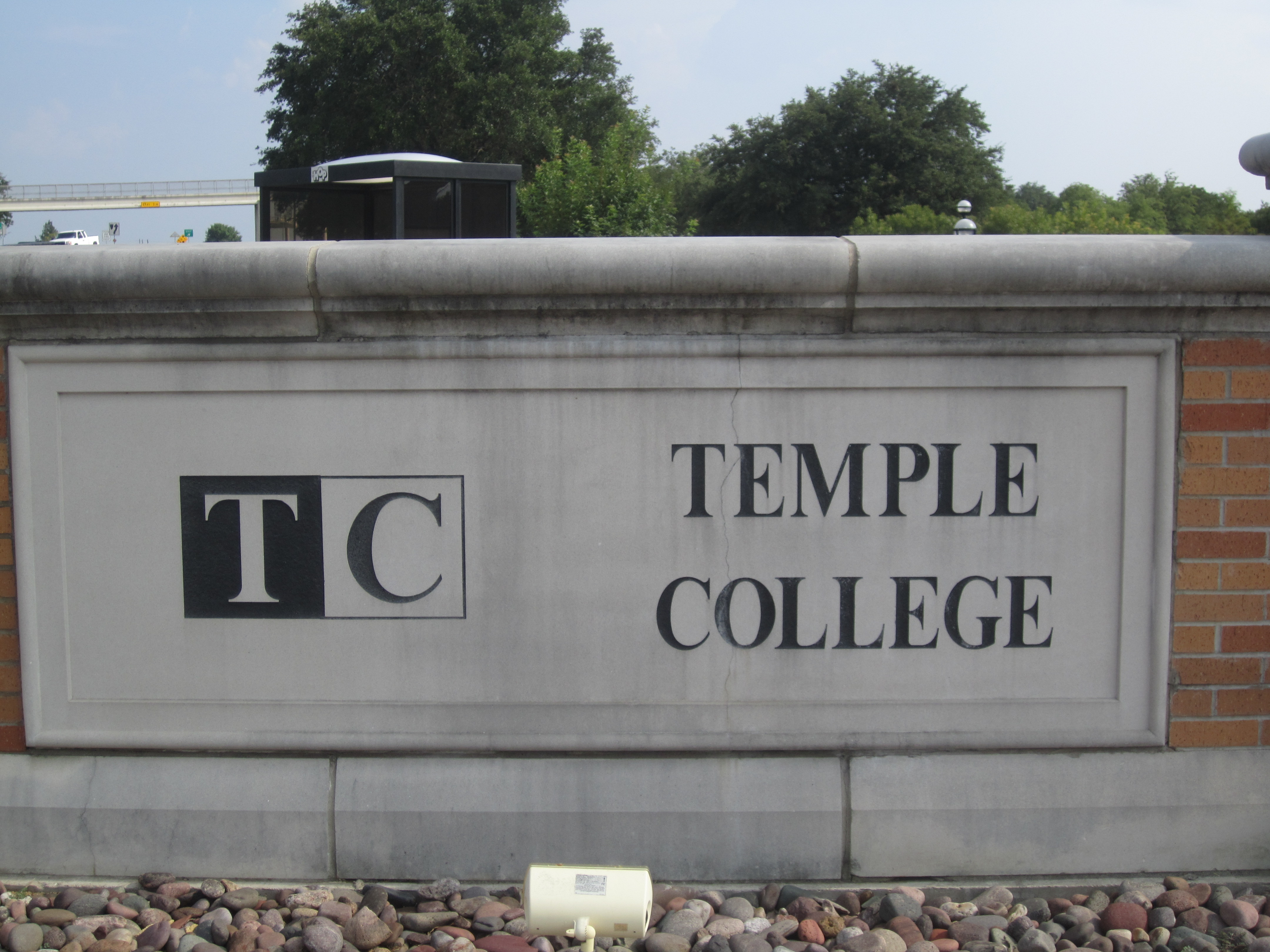
Temple College sign

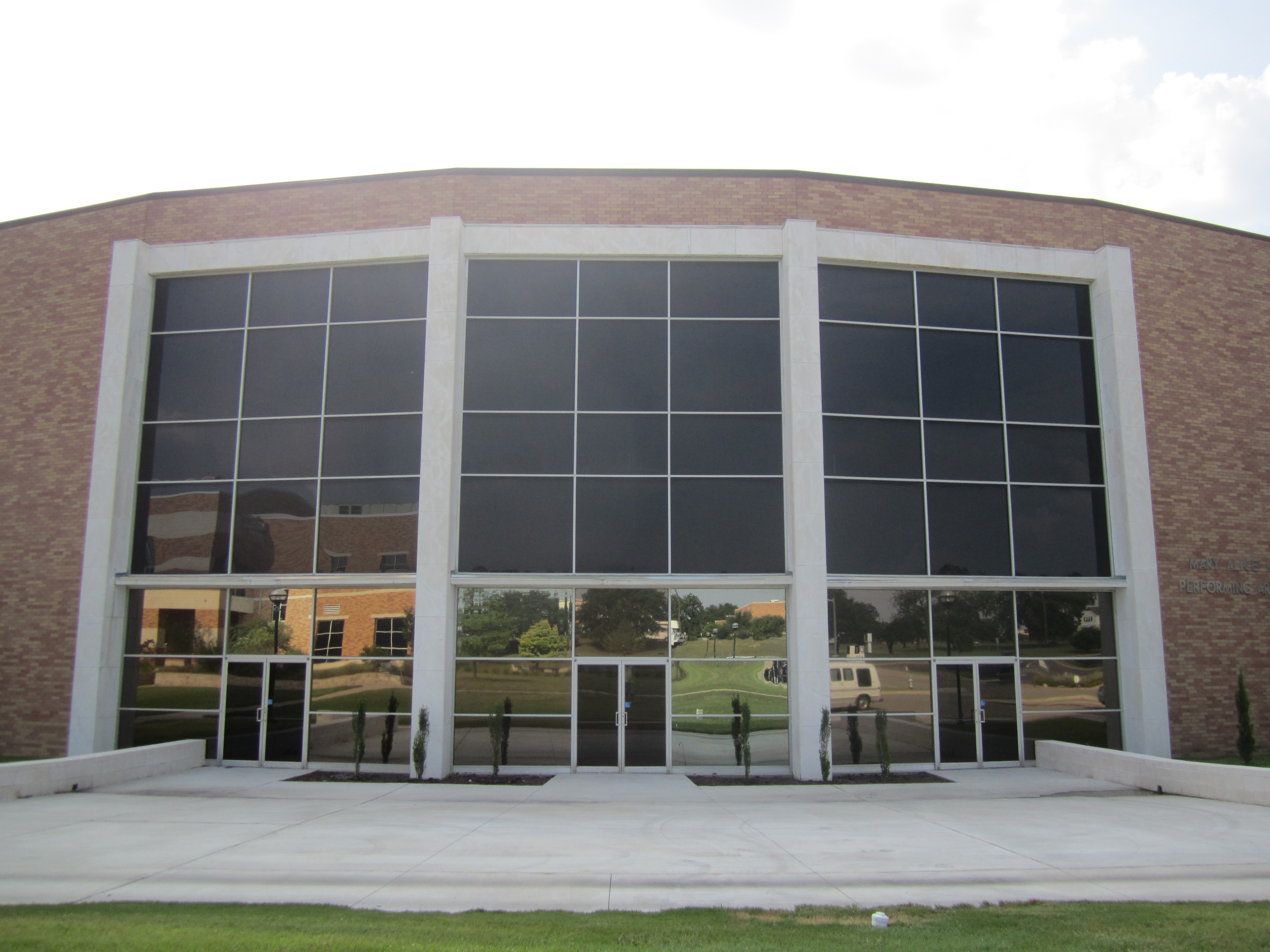
Mary Alice Marshall Performing Arts Building

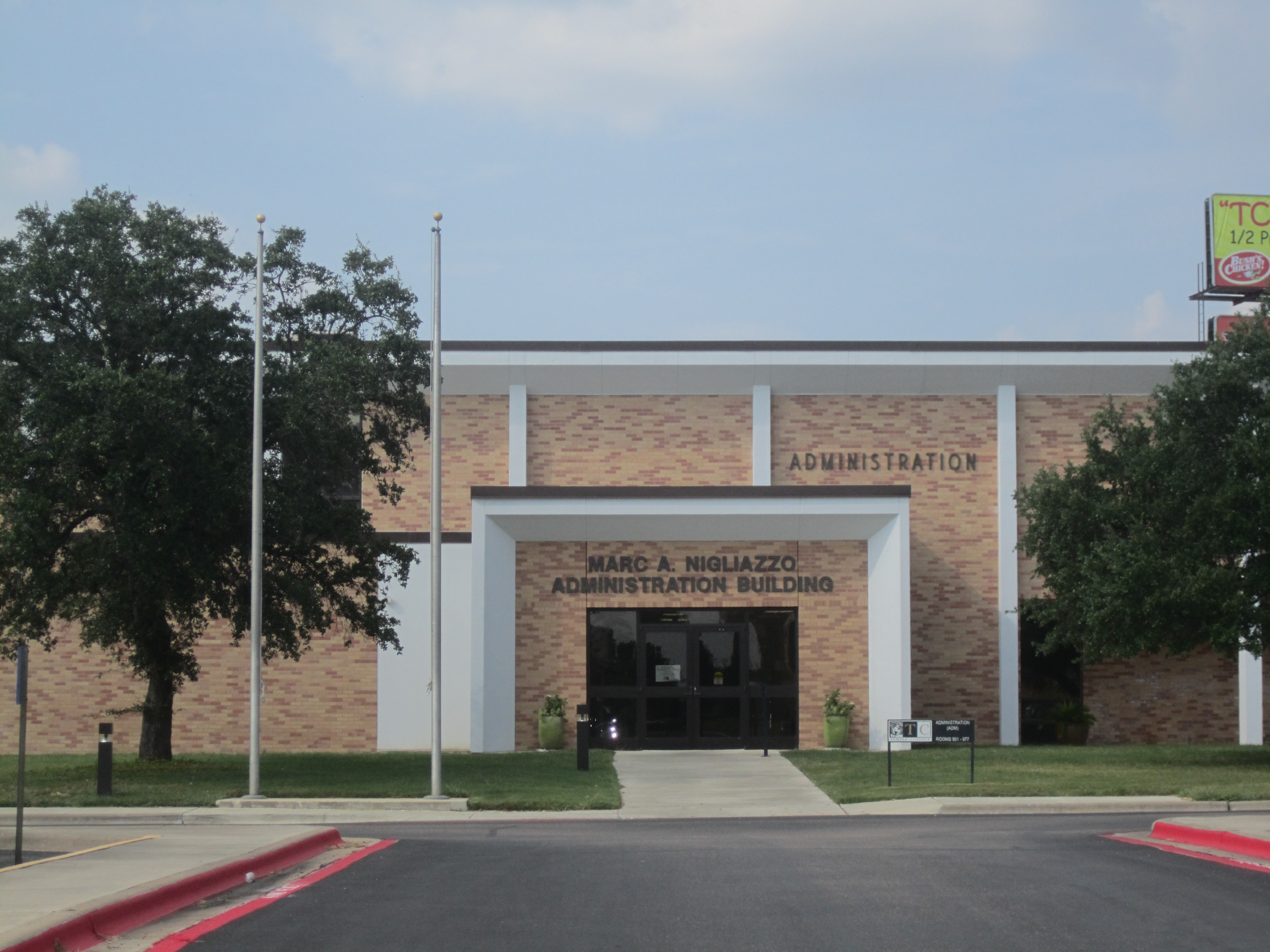
Marc A. Nigliazzo Administration Building

== Notable people ==
- Henry T. Waskow, alumnus, US Army captain memorialized in Ernie Pyle's dispatch "The Death of Captain Waskow"
- W. J. Adkins, the dean of Temple Junior College during the 1940s, became in 1947 the founding president of Laredo Community College in Laredo.
- David Wesley, alumnus, retired NBA and CBA basketball and current television color analyst for the New Orleans Pelicans
- Whurley (William Hurley), alumnus, co-founder of Chaotic Moon Studios, an open source advocate, and systems theorist
- Boone Logan, alumnus, left-handed relief pitcher for the Colorado Rockies

== Athletics ==
- Baseball
- Men's Basketball
- Softball
- Volleyball
- Women's Basketball
