= Impossible Foods =

American meat substitutes manufacturer

- Type: Private
- Industry: Food
- Founded: 2011; 15 years ago
- Founder: Patrick O. Brown
- Headquarters: Redwood City, California, US
- Key people: Dennis Woodside (President); Peter McGuinness (CEO)
- Website: ImpossibleFoods.com

Impossible Foods Inc. is a company that develops plant-based substitutes for meat products. The company's signature product, the Impossible Burger, was launched in July 2016 as a vegan alternative to a beef hamburger.

In partnership with Burger King, Impossible Whoppers were released across the United States by summer 2019. The company also makes plant-based chicken products and pork products.

== Company and product history ==
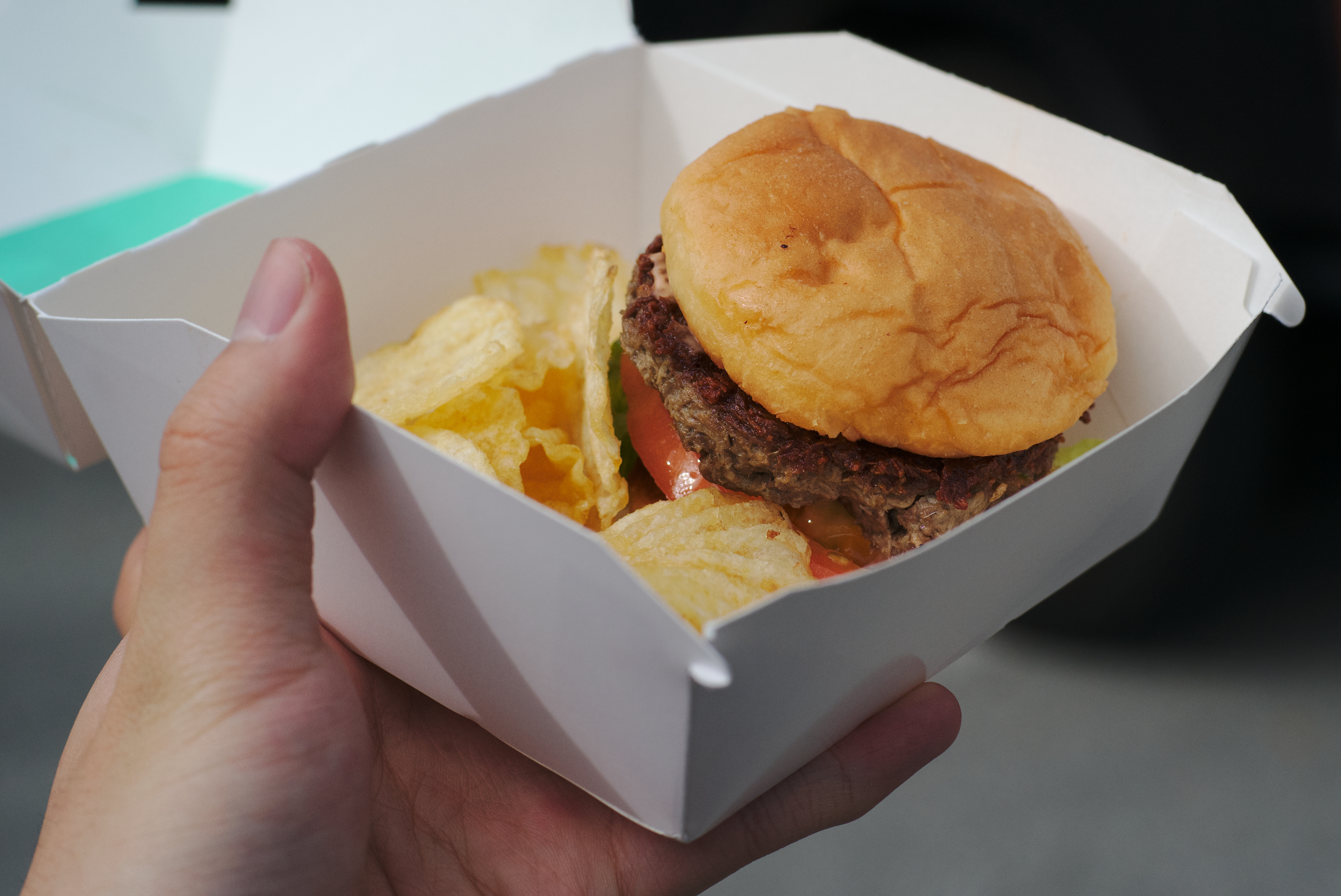
An Impossible Burger given out during a promotional event at a food truck in San Francisco in November 2016

Impossible Foods was founded by Patrick O. Brown, a biochemistry professor at Stanford, in 2011. Impossible Foods initially also worked on plant-based products that emulated chicken, pork, fish, and dairy, but decided to concentrate first on creating a substitute for the ground beef in burger patties.

In July 2016, the company launched its first meat analogue product, the Impossible Burger, which is made from material derived from plants. The company says that making it uses 95% less land and 74% less water, and it emits about 87% less greenhouse gas than making a ground beef burger patty from cows.

On January 7, 2019, Impossible Foods introduced the Impossible Burger 2.0.

In May 2019, Little Caesars began serving Impossible Foods' first plant-based sausage on pizzas in Florida, New Mexico, and Washington state. Patrick Brown said the product had involved the development of 50 prototype sausage products before Little Caesars began offering it to the public. In January 2020, Impossible Foods launched Impossible Sausage (also marketed as Impossible Pork) more widely.

In late 2021, the company launched Impossible Chicken.

== Production and ingredients ==
Unlike most plant-based products intended to emulate meat, the Impossible Burger contains heme. Heme is the molecule that gives blood its red color and helps carry oxygen in living organisms. Heme is abundant in animal muscle tissue and is also found naturally in all living organisms. Plants, particularly nitrogen-fixing plants and legumes, also contain heme. The plant-based heme molecule is identical to the heme molecule found in meat.

To produce heme protein from non-animal sources, Impossible Foods selected the leghemoglobin molecule found naturally in the roots of soy plants. To make it in large quantities, the company's scientists genetically engineered a yeast and used a fermentation process very similar to the brewing process used to make some types of beer.

The plant-based burger has more protein, less total fat, no cholesterol, and less food energy than a similar-sized hamburger patty made with beef. It contains more sodium and more saturated fats than an unseasoned beef patty.

=== Food safety approval ===
==== United States ====
In 2014, Impossible Foods declared leghemoglobin is generally recognized as safe after testing under oversight from the US Food and Drug Administration (FDA). Impossible Foods filed updates with the FDA in 2017 and 2018. In July 2018, the FDA issued a "no questions" letter, accepting the unanimous conclusion of a panel of food-safety experts that the heme protein is safe to eat.

The FDA's acceptance in 2018 was limited to Impossible Burgers cooked in restaurants until soy leghemoglobin underwent safety review as a new food colorant for uncooked products. In July 2019, the FDA accepted the colorant in uncooked products, allowing the sale of Impossible Burgers in grocery stores in September the same year. In December 2019, the FDA affirmed this decision after considering an objection, finding that Impossible Foods had addressed the safety of soy leghemoglobin.

In May 2021, a San Francisco federal appeals court upheld the FDA's decision. The court held that the FDA had “substantial evidence” to deem heme in Impossible Burgers safe to eat.

==== Canada ====
In January 2020, Health Canada approved the Impossible Burger patty for sale, notifying the company that it had 'no objection' to the level of soy leghemoglobin in the product.

== Product availability ==
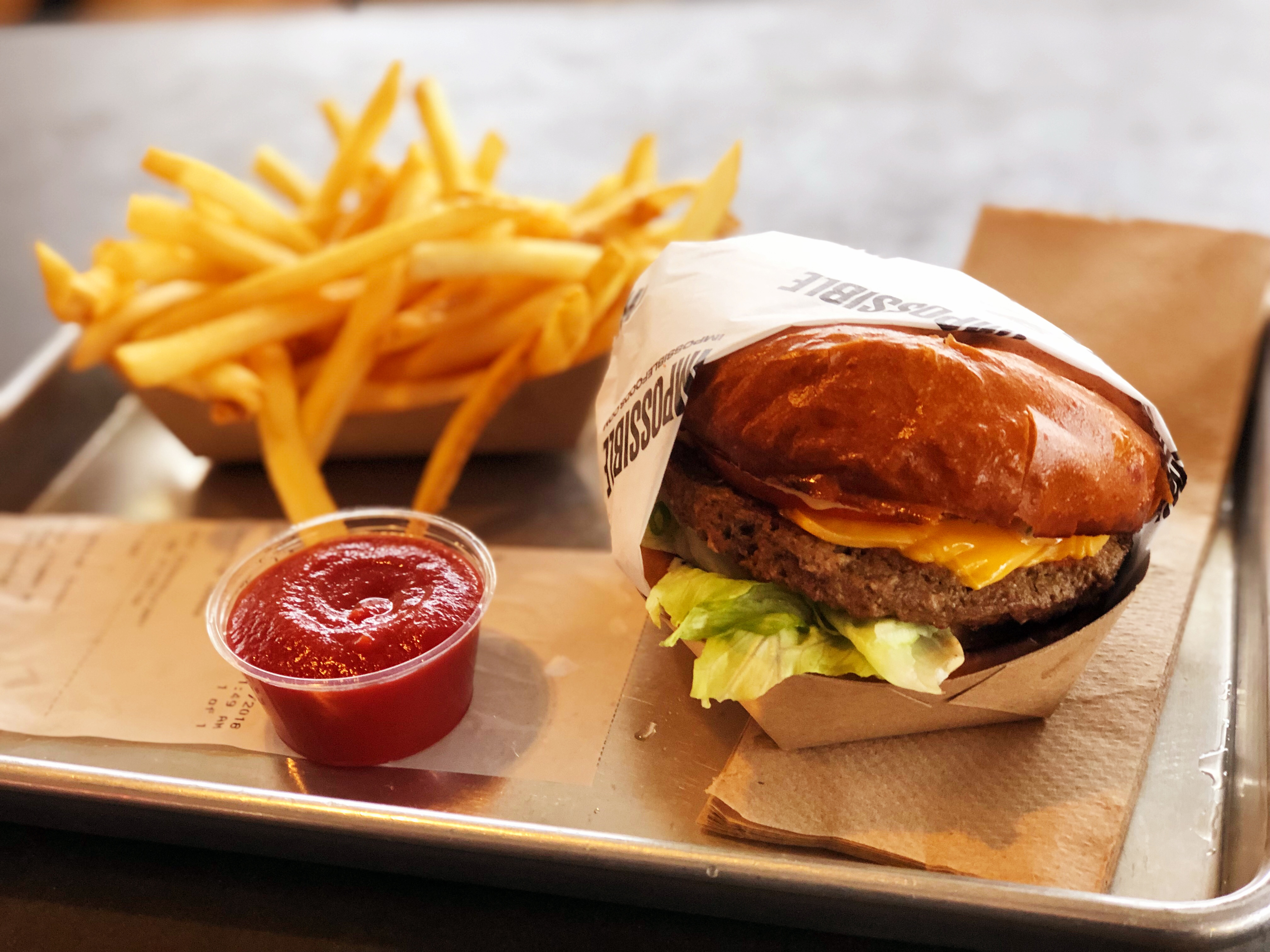
An Impossible Burger at Gott's Roadside in Napa in 2018

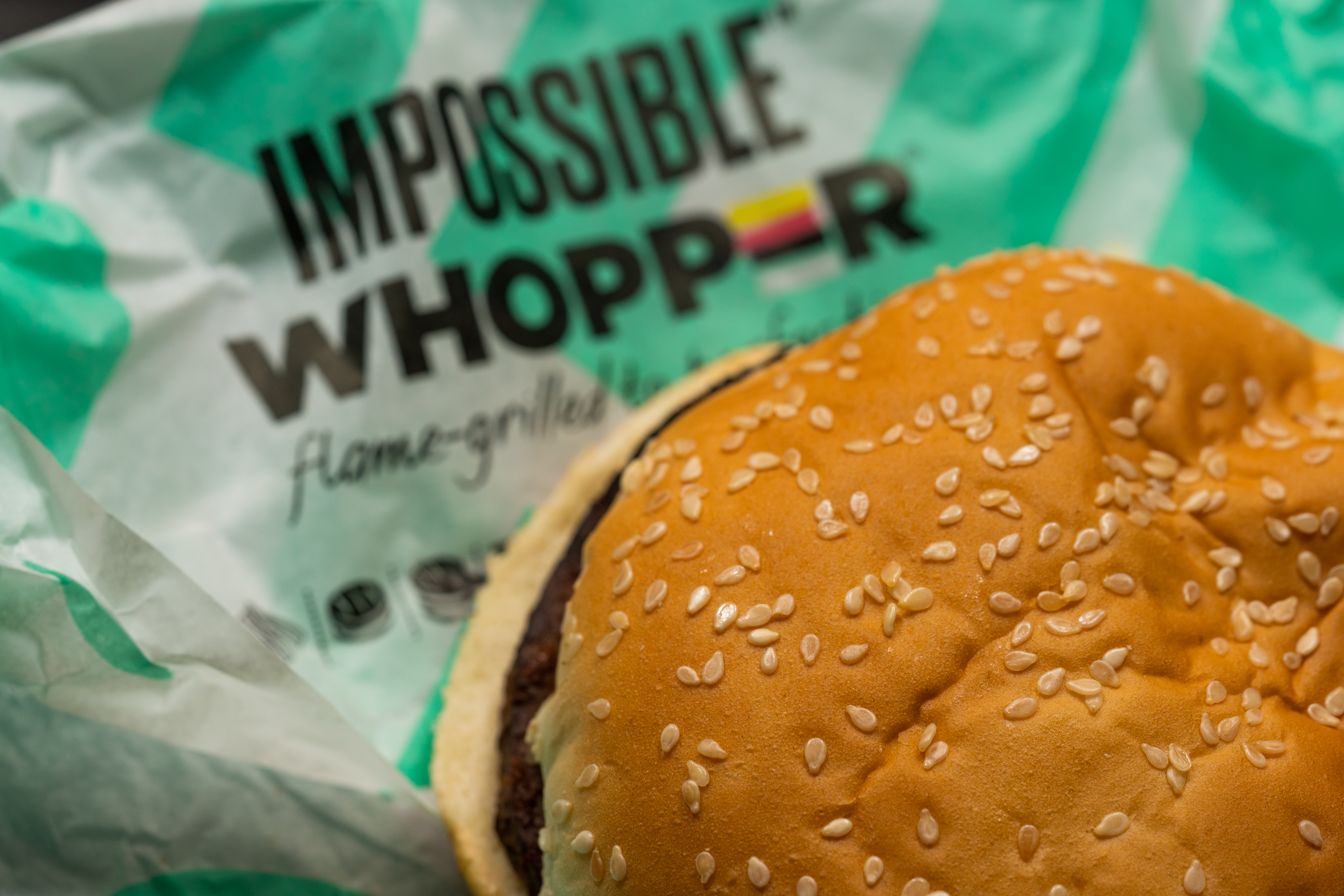
Impossible Whopper and packaging

=== In restaurants ===
In 2016 and 2017, Impossible Foods produced Impossible Burgers in both Redwood City, California, and at Rutgers University in New Jersey. Since the production was in relatively small quantities, the burgers were not available at retail locations.

The restaurant Momofuku Nishi in New York, owned by David Chang, began serving the Impossible Burger in July 2016. In October 2016, the Impossible Burger became a standing menu item in selected additional restaurants in California, such as Jardinière and Cockscomb in San Francisco, and Crossroads Kitchen in Los Angeles. The Michelin-starred restaurant Public, operated by Brad Farmerie, began serving the Impossible Burger in January 2017.

In March 2017, Impossible Foods announced it would build its first large-scale plant in Oakland, California, to produce 1 million pounds of plant-based burger meat per month. In the first half of 2017, the Impossible Burger debuted on the menu of multi-unit franchises, including Bareburger in New York City, Umami Burger in California, and Hopdoddy in Texas. In April 2018, White Castle started serving Impossible Burgers. The partnership with White Castle eventually expanded to include all 377 of its locations.

By July 2018, two years after its debut in New York, the Impossible Burger was available at about 3,000 locations in the United States and Hong Kong. By the end of 2018, 5,000 restaurants across all 50 states included the burger on their menus.

In April 2019, Burger King began test marketing an Impossible Whopper, using the patty at locations around St. Louis. Later that month, the company announced plans to roll out Impossible Whoppers nationwide before the end of the year. In August, it was officially made available nationwide.

=== Retail ===
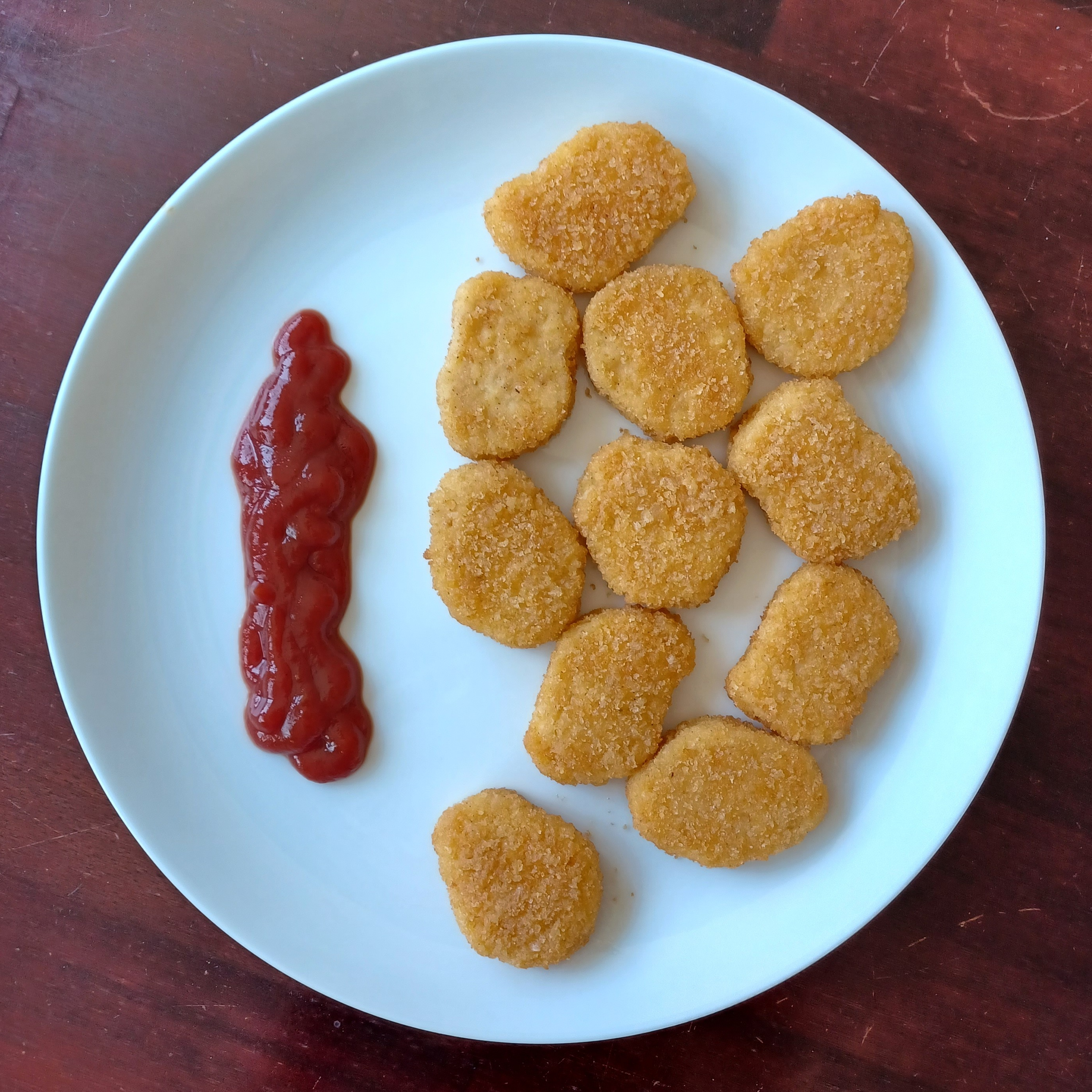
Plant-based chicken nuggets made by Impossible Foods

The Impossible Burger became available in grocery stores for the first time in October 2019, at Gelson's stores, which are only in Southern California.

In May 2020, Impossible Burgers were also available at Fairway Market, Wegman's, Jewel-Osco, Vons, Pavilions, Albertsons in California and Nevada, Safeway in California and Nevada, and various chains owned by Kroger. In April 2020, due to the COVID-19 pandemic in the United States, the FDA started allowing restaurants to sell Impossible beef substitute to consumers, with an additional printed-out sheet satisfying label requirements.

In July 2020, Impossible Burger patties became available at Trader Joe's and about 2,100 Walmart locations in the United States.

== Financing ==
Impossible Foods has raised rounds of $75 million and $108 million from investors, including Google Ventures, Khosla Ventures, Viking Global Investors, UBS, Hong Kong billionaire Li Ka-shing's Horizons Ventures, and Bill Gates. It was reported that Patrick Brown had turned down an offer of $300 million to buy out Impossible Foods in 2015.

In August 2017, $75 million in additional financing was raised after reaching key objectives, with Bill Gates investing additional money. In April 2018, an additional $114 million was raised, led by Singapore’s Temasek Holdings and Hong Kong-based Sailing Capital, bringing the total to $372 million. In May 2019, the company raised $300 million of investment. The total valuation of the company raised to $2 billion. On March 16, 2020, another $500 million was raised.

In total, Impossible Foods has raised $1.3 billion over 12 rounds of funding. In August 2020, the company raised another US$200 million in an internal round led by existing investor Coatue.

== Popularity and cultural impact ==
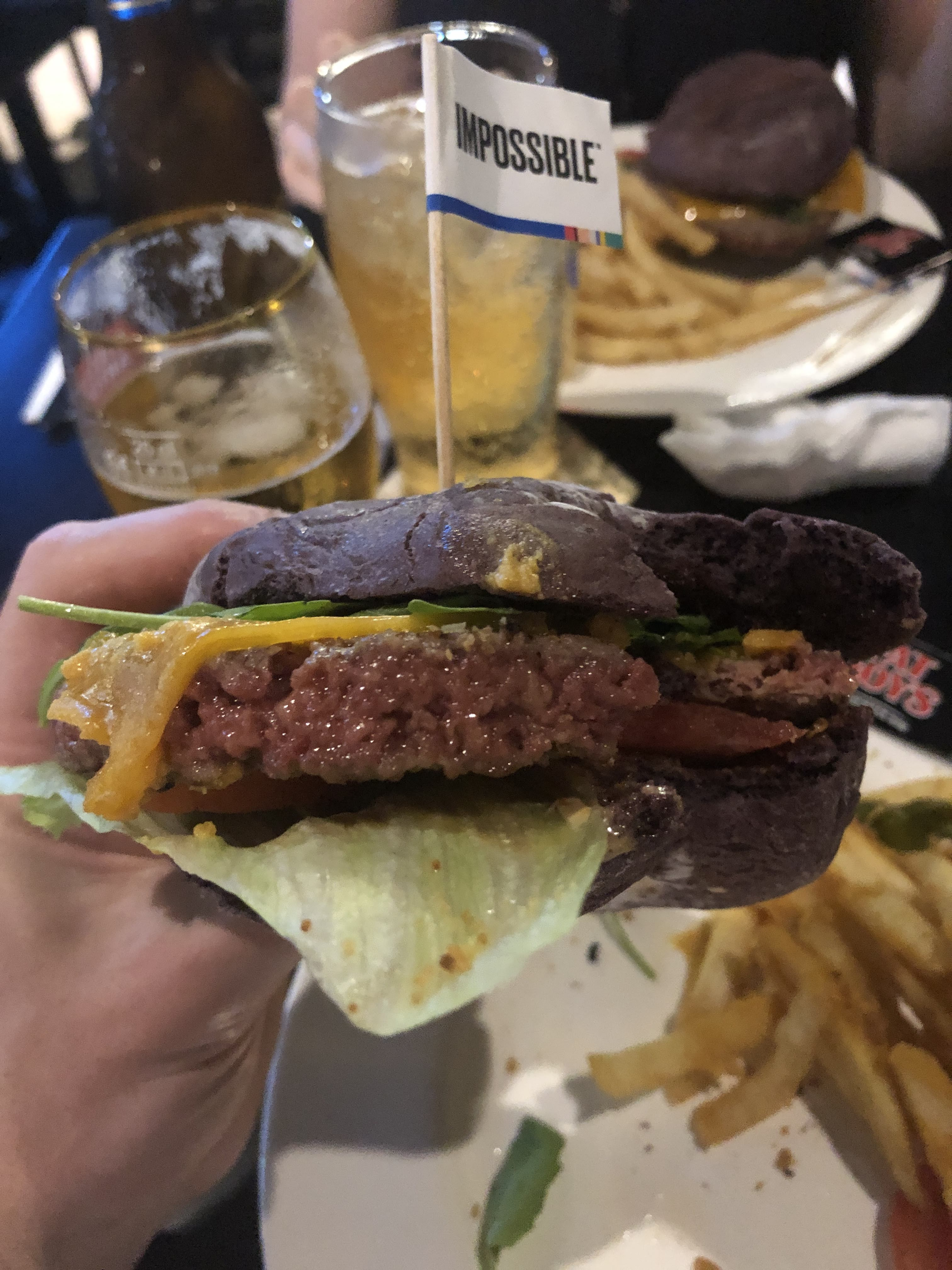
An Impossible Burger showing its signature 'bleeding' juice

Business Insider has described the Impossible Burger as "a burger that satisfies even the most ardent meat-lovers". Vox has said that it "tastes pretty beefy" such that "many foodies now consider their products not only tolerable but trendy".

The Impossible Burger received Kosher certification in May 2018 and Halal certification in December 2018.

In 2019, TIME listed the Impossible Burger 2.0 as one of the 100 Best Inventions of 2019. That same year, Engadget awarded the Impossible Burger the titles of 'Most Impactful Product' and 'Best of the Best' at CES 2019. Further, at COP25, Impossible Foods received a UN Global Climate Action Award in the category of 'Planetary Health'.

In 2020, TIME listed Impossible Pork as one of the 100 Best Inventions of 2020.

LightLife, a brand of meat analogues, criticized its competitors Beyond Meat and Impossible Foods in an open letter published in The New York Times, asking that these companies reduce their use of "hyperprocessed" ingredients. Impossible Foods responded by calling it a "disingenuous, desperate disinformation campaign".

The Center for Consumer Freedom (CCF), a nonprofit advocacy group that has received funding from the meat industry, has targeted Impossible Foods and other meat analogue producers through advertising, including a commercial during Super Bowl LIV, criticizing meat analogues for using additives. Impossible Foods quickly answered with a parody commercial highlighting that fecal bacteria has been found in ground beef.

== See also ==
- Beyond Meat
- Veganism
- Vegetarianism
