= Sanjay Jha (businessman) =

Indian-American business executive

Sanjay Jhā
- Born: Sultanganj, Bhagalpur, Bihar, India
- Education: University of Strathclyde (BS); University of Liverpool (PhD)
- Children: 3

Sanjay Kumar Jhā is an Indian-American business executive. He is the former chief executive officer (CEO) of GlobalFoundries and former chairman and CEO of Motorola Mobility. Prior to that, he was the chief operating officer of Qualcomm.

== Early life ==
Jha was born in India in a Maithil Brahmin family. He received a BS in electrical engineering from the University of Liverpool and a PhD in electronics engineering from the University of Strathclyde. In 2011, Sanjay was awarded the honorary degree of D.Sc. by the University of Strathclyde.

== Career ==
Jha began his career at Qualcomm in 1994 as a senior engineer with the Qualcomm very-large-scale integration group working on the Globalstar satellite phone, and later on the first 13k vocoder application-specific integrated circuit, which was integrated into Qualcomm's MSM2200 chipset. In 1997 Jha was promoted to vice-president of engineering, where he was responsible for leading the integrated-circuit engineering group. Jha led and oversaw the development of five generations of modem and cell site chipsets, both digital baseband and RF (radio frequency), and system software. He was promoted to senior vice-president of engineering in 1998.

In 2002 he led the formation of Qualcomm Technologies & Ventures, where he managed both the technology investment portfolio and the new technology group as senior vice-president and general manager. Jha became executive vice-president of Qualcomm and president of Qualcomm CDMA Technologies in 2003 and was appointed COO in December 2006.

On 4 August 2008 it was announced he would be the new CEO for the Motorola Mobile Devices business. He served in this role until May 22, 2012, when Dennis Woodside of Google took over the role of CEO at Motorola Mobility.

On January 7, 2014, it was announced that Sanjay Jha would be the CEO of GlobalFoundries Inc. GlobalFoundries is a privately held company with its headquarters in Santa Clara, California, United States. GlobalFoundries is the second largest semiconductor foundry business in the world with fabs in Malta, New York, Dresden, Germany, Singapore, East Fishkill, New York and Essex Junction, Vermont.

Before joining Qualcomm, Jha held lead design engineering roles with Brooktree Corporation in San Diego, and Hirst Research Centre in London.

Jha has served on the board of directors of the Semiconductor Industry Association, and as vice-chairman of the Fabless Semiconductor Association (now the Global Semiconductor Alliance (GSA)).

On March 9, 2018, he stepped down as CEO of GlobalFoundries.

Also in 2018, Jha was elected a member of the National Academy of Engineering for leadership in the design and development of semiconductor technology enabling universal digital access.

== Compensation ==
As a Co-CEO of Motorola in 2008, Sanjay Jha was paid a total of $8,462,544, which included a base salary of $905,769, a $836,931 cash bonus, stocks granted of $2,356,136, and options granted of $4,004,000.

After the Google acquisition of Motorola Mobility is complete, Jha would receive $13.20 million in cash and $52.5 million for his stock options and shares. The cash component of the Golden Parachute package included $10.8 million in severance pay and a $2.4 million bonus. The cash portion is equal to three times Jha's base salary and bonus. Jha stepped down after the deal was completed on 22 May 2012.
