= Yalo (company) =

Artificial intelligence platform

- Industry: Artificial intelligence, chatbots, services on messaging apps
- Founder: Javier Mata
- Headquarters: Mexico City, Mexico
- Number of locations: 4
- Website: yalo.ai

Yalo (formerly Yalochat) is an artificial intelligence platform specializing in emerging markets. Its headquarters were formerly in San Francisco with offices in Mexico City, Mumbai, Shanghai, Bogotá, and São Paulo. It subsequently relocated to Mexico City.

== Overview ==
Yalo enables companies to interact with their customers in conversational commerce on messaging apps including WhatsApp, Facebook Messenger, and WeChat.

Customers include Walmart, Nike, Volkswagen, Aeroméxico, appliance and electronics retailer Elektra, Mexico's largest department store, Coppel, and Mexico's largest theme resort Xcaret.

The company was founded in Mexico by CEO Javier Mata and was formerly based in San Francisco, but subsequently moved to Mexico. As at 2021 its board of directors includes Mark Fernandes and Rashmi Gopinath.

In February 2018, the company announced the opening of its office in Shanghai, China, in alliance with venture capitalist Michael Kuan's company Strategic Impact Group.

In May 2021, Yalo raised $50 million in new funding led by B Capital, for a total of $75 million in total funding.

== Platforms / Apps ==
=== Facebook Messenger ===
Yalochat introduced a variety of services on Facebook Messenger in 2016, shortly after Facebook launched its chatbot platform.

In April 2017, it announced that its chatbot with Aeroméxico had added an artificial intelligence component to the Facebook Messenger bot.

=== WhatsApp ===
In October 2017, Aeroméxico announced that together with Yalochat it would launch services on the new enterprise platform of WhatsApp, the world's most popular messaging platform, and that it would be the first airline in The Americas to do so. Services available via WhatsApp include shopping for and purchasing flights, making changes, checking in and obtaining a boarding pass, and tracking a flight. It includes both an artificial intelligence-powered chatbot, and chat with the airline's human agents.

=== WeChat ===
In February 2018 Yalochat announced the opening of its office in Shanghai, China and that it had begun offering services on WeChat, China's most popular messaging app.

=== Line ===
In an interview, Yalochat CEO Javier Mata said that the company was planning to offer services on Line messenger, popular in Japan, Korea and Thailand.
