= Hypergiant Industries =

American technology company

- Company type: Private
- Industry: Artificial intelligence
- Founded: February 2018
- Founder: Ben Lamm; Will Womble; John Fremont
- Headquarters: Austin, Texas, United States
- Area served: Worldwide
- Key people: Mike Betzer (CEO); Ben Lamm (Founder); C.K. Sample (Chief Customer Officer); Mike Roberts (CTO); Quentin Donnellan (President, Space & Defense); Tim Paulin (CFO); Marc Katz (General Counsel)
- Number of employees: 185
- Website: hypergiant.com

Hypergiant is an Austin, Texas based technology company, founded in February 2018, and currently headed by CEO Mike Betzer.

The company develops artificial intelligence (AI) products, focused on its CommandCenter Platform.

In August 2019, global consulting firm Booz Allen announced a venture with Hypergiant to deliver AI products for public sector clients. In September 2019, its algae-based air cleaner, was noted by Fast Company as a "world-changing idea", and was reviewed in Popular Mechanics, and other media.

In August 2023, it was announced the Dallas-based private equity company, Trive Capital had acquired Hypergiant for an undisclosed amount.
