= Gott's Roadside =

Northern California restaurant chain

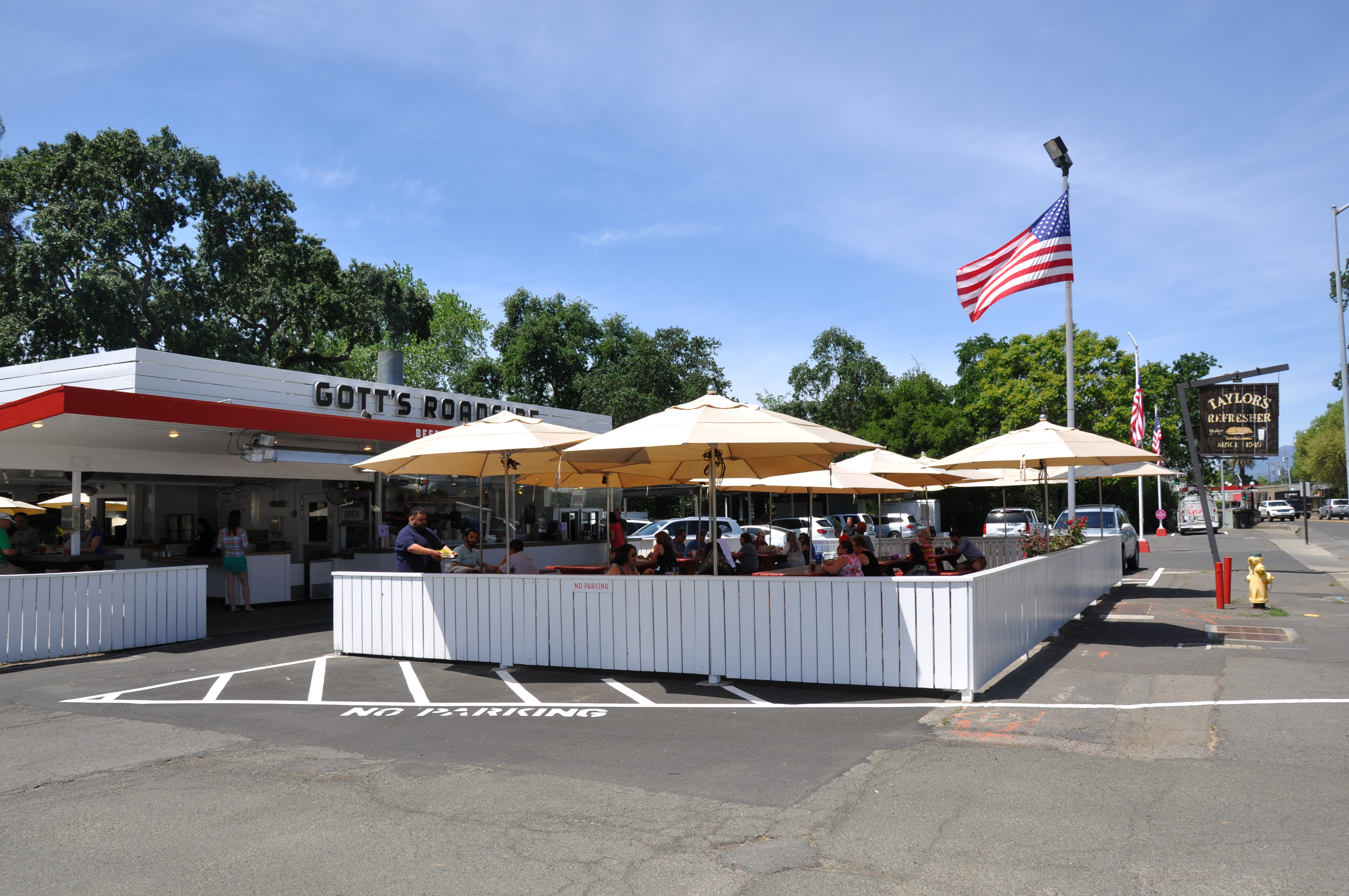
Gott's Roadside in St. Helena

Gott's Roadside is a restaurant group located in Northern California with seven locations in the San Francisco Bay Area and two in Los Angeles. It is a diner-concept restaurant with influence from California cuisine.

== About ==
The family-owned company serves fast food made with locally sourced ingredients cooked to order, including hamburgers and Ahi burgers, salads, French fries, and milkshakes, plus seasonal specials like the “Seoul” pork burger with kimchi and the B.L.T. with heirloom tomatoes. On July 25, 2017, Gott's started serving the vegan Impossible burger. Food & Wine magazine has labeled it as an “idealized version of the American roadside stand”.

== History ==
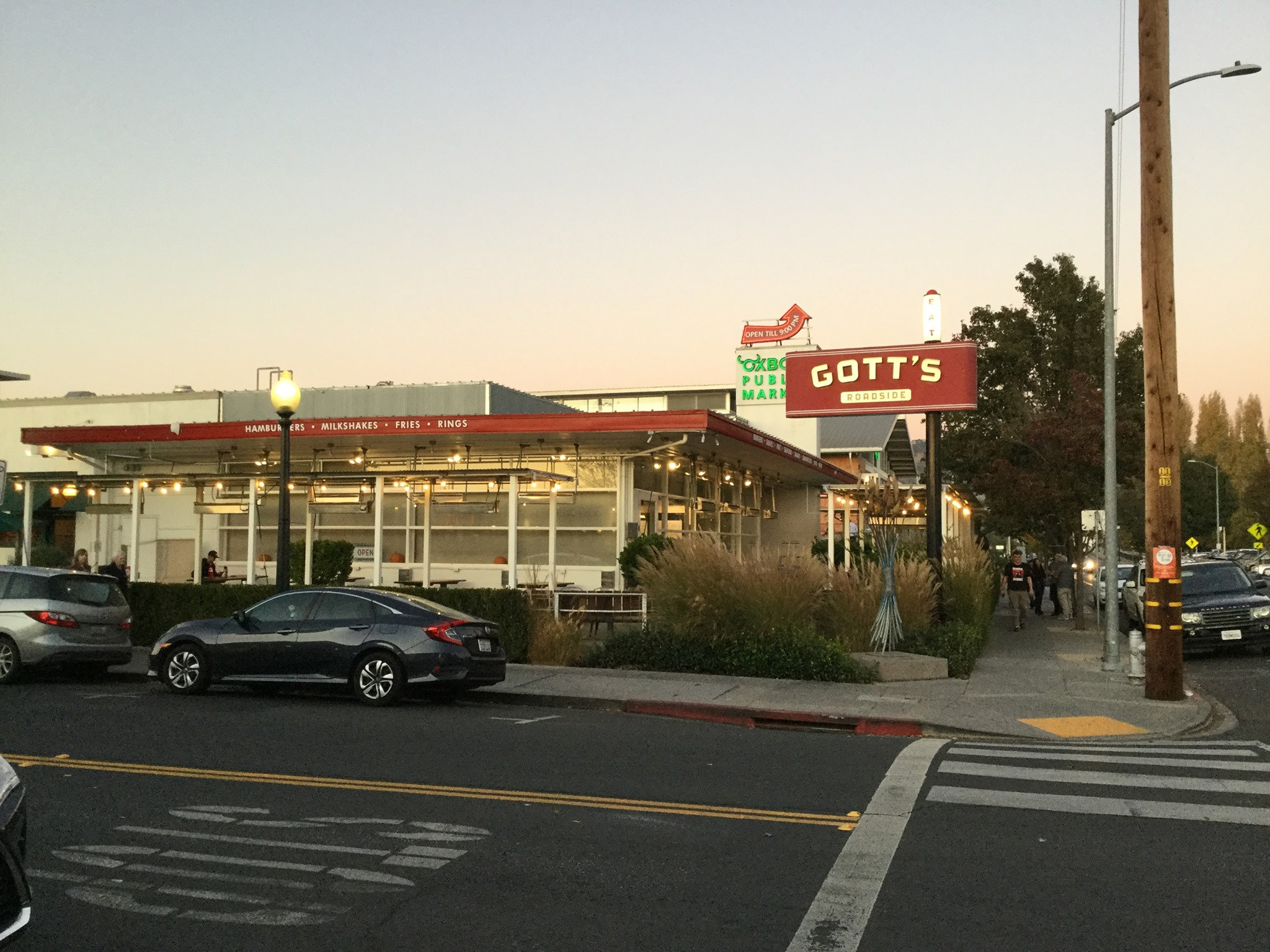
Gott's Roadside in Napa

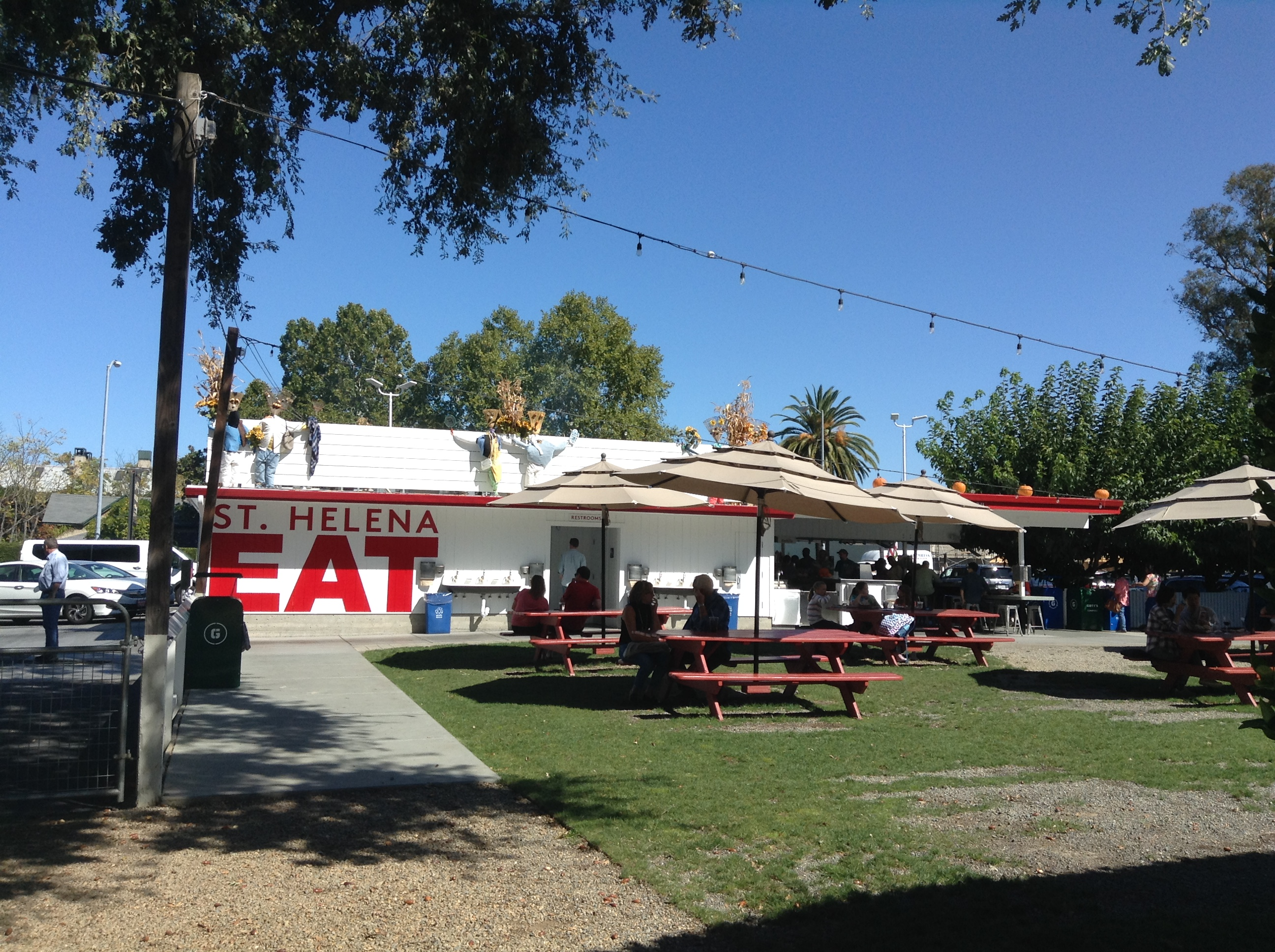
Dining area at the St. Helena restaurant

When the owners of Taylor's Refresher burger shack in St. Helena decided to lease out their 50-year-old property, brothers Joel and Duncan Gott signed. The restaurant became Taylor's Automatic Refresher when the first location re-opened in St. Helena in 1999, and, in the aftermath of a trademark dispute and the protests of the Taylor family, was renamed in 2010 as Gott's Roadside.

The restaurants embrace a California-casual cooking style, featuring microbrewed beer and wines alongside chili cheese dogs and mini corn dogs. In 2004, a second Gott's opened in the Ferry Building Marketplace in San Francisco, and in 2007, a third opened in the Oxbow Public Market of Napa. The St. Helena spot is a drive-in, with seating at red picnic tables on the lawn, while the other two locations are built in an urban, retro diner-style. In 2013, a fourth location opened in Palo Alto. The newest Gott's Roadside location is now open in Greenbrae in Marin County. The company remains privately owned.

In 2006 Taylor's received the James Beard Foundation Award designating them as one of America's Classics. In addition to The New York Times and Food & Wine, Taylor's/Gott's has been featured in USA Today, Bon Appétit, Gourmet, Travel + Leisure, Robert M. Parker Jr.'s The Wine Advocate. and Season 1, Episode 8 of Food Network's Diners, Drive-Ins, and Dives.

Gott's announced its plans to expand into Los Angeles on May 5, 2025 with two locations, the first being in The Original Farmers Market and the second being located in Santa Monica. The Farmers Market location opened on March 6, 2026, and the Santa Monica location followed soon after on October 2, 2026

== Gallery ==
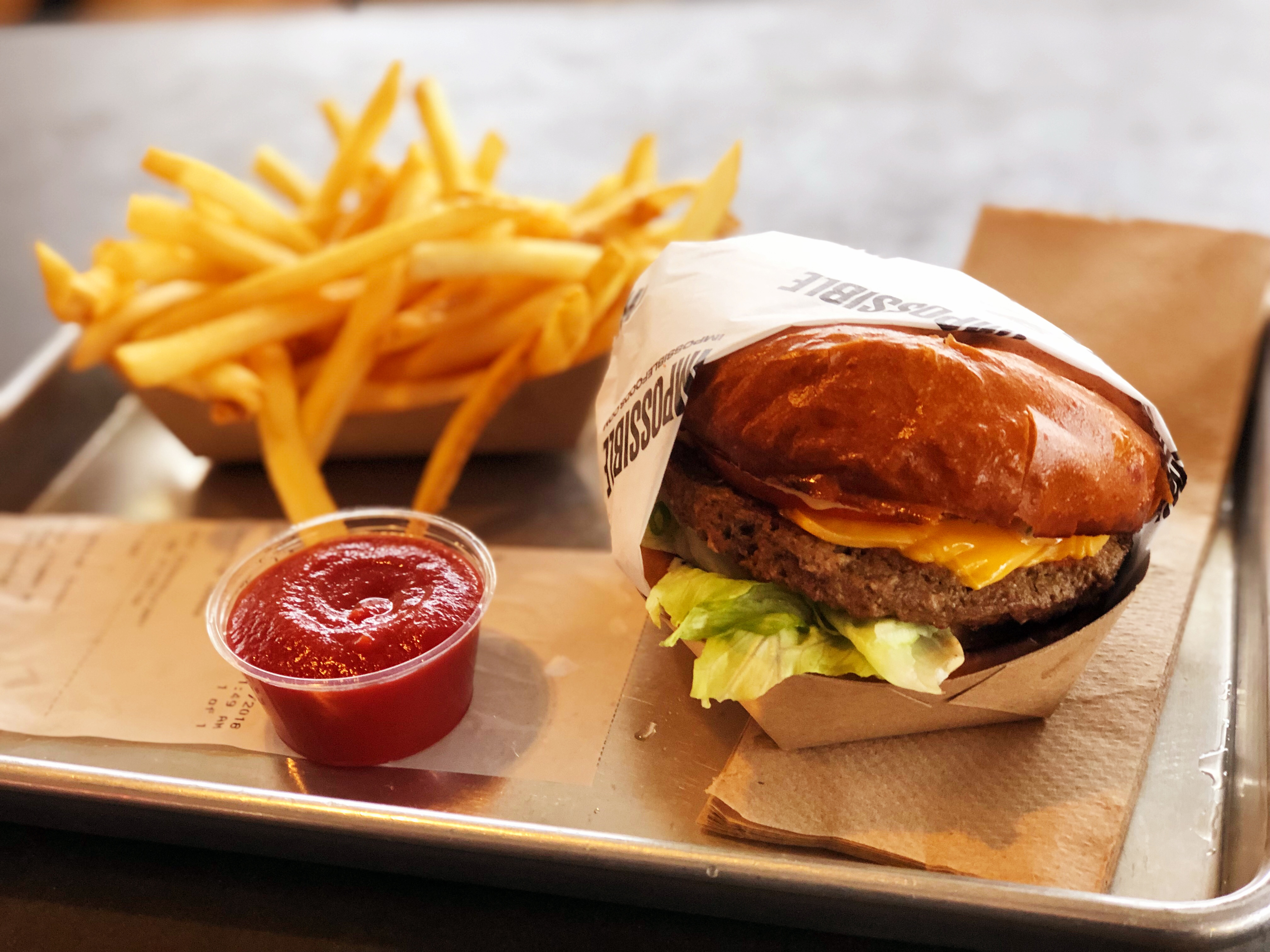
Impossible Burger with fries and ketchup at Gott's Roadside

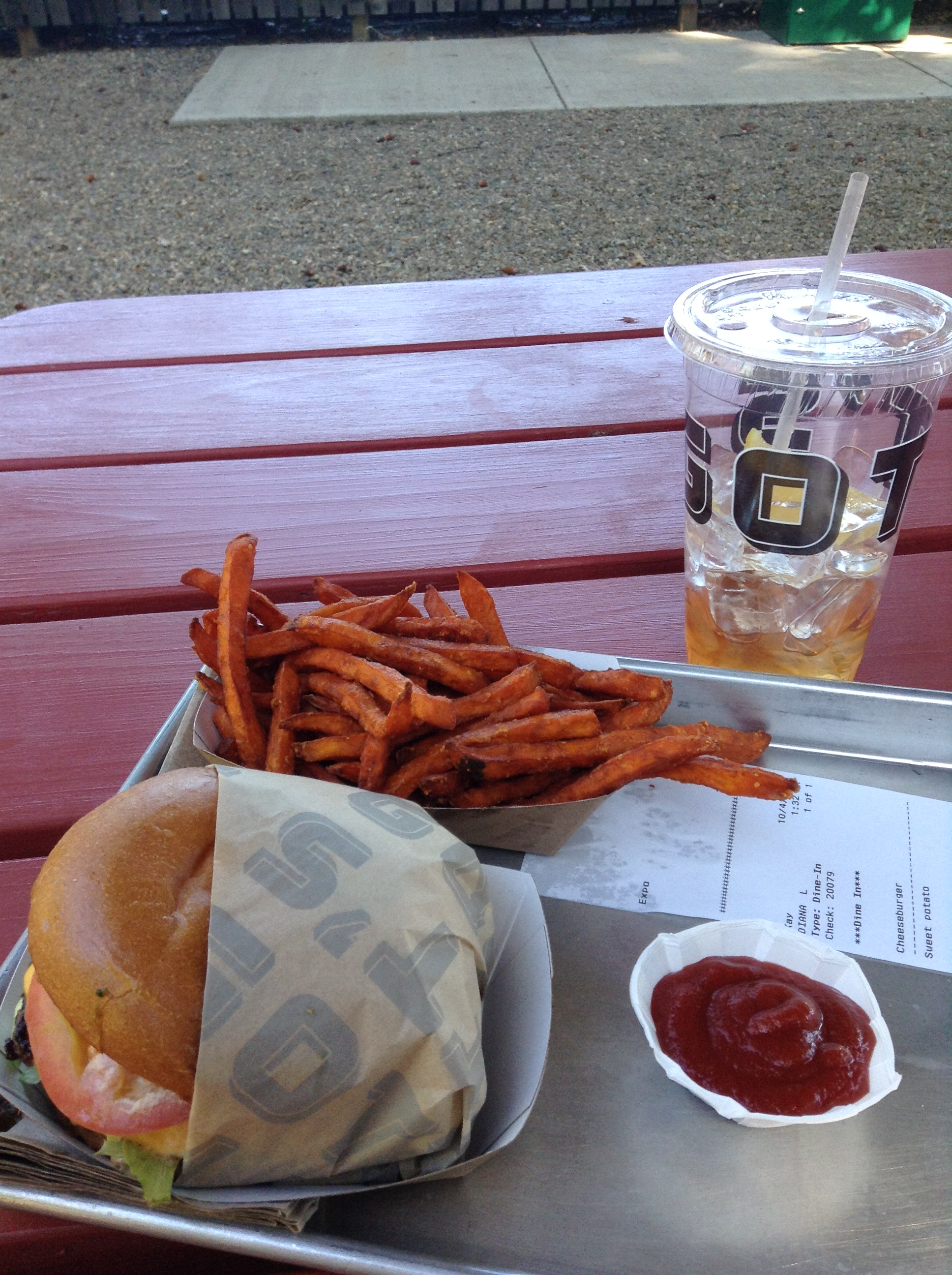
Hamburger with sweet potato fries
