= Dennis Woodside =

American businessman (born 1969)

- Born: 1969 (age 56–57)
- Education: Cornell University; Stanford University
- Known for: President of Impossible Foods

Dennis Woodside (born 1969) is an American businessman who is president and CEO of Freshworks. Before joining Freshworks in 2022, he was president of Impossible Foods from March 2019 until August 2022. He previously was the chief operating officer of Dropbox from April 2014 until December 2018. He was an advisor to Dropbox from September through December 2018.

== Early life and education ==
Woodside grew up in Washington Crossing, Pennsylvania. He graduated from Cornell University in 1991, where he rowed and earned two varsity letters. He then went to Stanford Law School, graduating in 1995.

== Career ==
After graduating from Stanford Law, he was selected for a clerkship on the United States Court of Appeals for the Second Circuit for Judge Dennis Jacobs. After his clerkship, he worked at the law firm of Munger, Tolles & Olson from 1996 until 1998.

In July 1998, Woodside joined the Los Angeles office of McKinsey & Company, where he led strategy, technology, and media projects with Shona Brown, Michael Wolf, and Byron Auguste.

He left McKinsey in 2003 to join Google, where he led sales operations in Europe, the Middle East, and Africa.

Woodside was the senior vice president of Google's America operations.

In May 2012, Woodside succeeded Sanjay Jha as CEO of Motorola Mobility, where he worked until April 2014.

On February 12, 2014 he joined cloud storage company Dropbox as COO. This move came after Google announced the sale of Motorola Mobility to Lenovo in January 2014.

Woodside was on the board of ServiceNow from April 2018 until August 2022. He was on the board of the American Red Cross from 2016 to 2022.

From 2019 to 2022, Woodside was the president of Impossible Foods.

In May 2024, Woodside replaced Girish Mathrubootham as the CEO of Freshworks. He first joined Freshworks in 2022 as president, leading the company’s global business operations and strategy.

== Personal life ==
Woodside is a triathlon enthusiast and 15-time Ironman Triathlon finisher, with personal best of 9:22 at the Arizona Ironman in 2016. He got 2nd place in his age group, which qualified him for the Ironman World Championship in Kona, Hawaii in October 2017. Woodside met his wife when they attended Stanford Law School together. They have two children and two cats. Woodside resides in Atherton, California.
