= Chaotic Moon Studios =

American creative technology studio

- Company type: Private
- Industry: Mobile apps Interactive entertainment IoT Integration; Disruptive Software; Enterprise Applications; Creative Technology; Emerging Technologies
- Founded: 2010
- Founder: Ben Lamm; Mike Erwin whurley (William Hurley)
- Headquarters: Austin, Texas
- Key people: Ben Lamm (CEO); Mike Erwin (CFO); John Fremont (Chief Revenue Officer); Chad Darbyshire (EVP Marketing); C.K. Sample III (EVP Technology); Ivan Cook (EVP Design)
- Number of employees: 200

Chaotic Moon Studios was an American creative technology studio focused on software, mobile development and design. Chaotic Moon was founded in 2010 in Austin, Texas. After several years of growth and acquisitions, Chaotic Moon opened a second Dallas location in 2015.

== History ==
Chaotic Moon was founded in March 2010 by Ben Lamm, Whurley (William Hurley) and Mike Erwin. In 2012, they launched Chaotic Moon Labs, a research and development division that involved into BASE, their in-house innovation lab.

- March 2013 - Hollywood talent agency William Morris Endeavor, in conjunction with their technology investment and equity partner Silver Lake Partners, announced that they had taken a significant position in Chaotic Moon Studios.
- July 2015 - Chaotic Moon was acquired by consulting and technology services company Accenture, as part of the company's interactive, social media and artificial intelligence division.

== Divisions ==
=== Software ===
While Chaotic Moon was reported to have many projects for high-profile clients under NDA, some of the brands they’re known to have worked with include News Corp, Microsoft, Pizza Hut, Fox, CBS Sports, Sanrio, Betty Crocker, Starbucks, Best Buy, Groupon and Discovery Channel.

Chaotic Moon had an in-house R&D team, known for their creative innovations. The team created the SmartestCart, a “smart” shopping cart capable of following the user around the store, making suggestions for the grocery list and meal ideas, keeping track of allergies and allowing the user to bypass the checkout line. The company also created Tech Tats, an exploration into the use of skin-mounted components and conductive paint to create circuitry that lives on the human body in the form of a tattoo that has the capability to collect, store, send and receive data. Chaotic Moon has created two fitness tracking apparatuses: Fitcoin, which paid the user for their workout in Bitcoin, and a fitness tracker for wheelchair users that also gathers data that can be used for terrain mapping. Other notable projects include Sentiri, a proximity-sensing headband; Blue Eyes, a camera-equipped drone mounted to the roof of a police car that can take off and record an encounter from above; and a motorized skateboard, referred to as the Board of Awesomeness, that was showcased at South by Southwest in 2012. It reaches a top speed of 32 mph.

=== Games & Experiences ===
Among notable games that Chaotic Moon has created are two virtual-reality experiences. Shark Punch combined the Leap Motion device with the Oculus Rift for a game in which users were immersed in a virtual environment where they fought off sharks. Death From Above allowed for a two-player VR experience: player one ran the virtual reality driving game on a PC and player two used an iPad that communicates directly with the game in real time.

== Acquisitions ==
Chaotic Moon Studios has made a series of acquisitions since its inception in 2010. Two such public acquisitions were Dollar App and Symbiot Security. In May 2012, Chaotic Moon acquired Dollar App, a San Francisco-based mobile app developer founded in 2008 by Dom Sagolla. That same year, Dollar App developed Barack Obama’s official iPhone presidential campaign app. Dollar App became Chaotic Moon’s Bay Area satellite studio, with Sagolla staying on as chief product officer. Later in 2012, Chaotic Moon Studios purchased information and risk metrics security management company Symbiot Security. Symbiot, which was also co-founded by Hurley, previously specialized in providing information security for the US government and military, as well as corporate clients.

In July 2015, Chaotic Moon was acquired by consulting and technology service company Accenture.
