= Dom Sagolla =

- Born: Dominic Thomas Sagolla; January 4, 1974 (age 52); Hackensack, New Jersey, U.S.
- Education: Swarthmore College; Harvard University
- Occupations: Writer, Software engineer
- Known for: Twitter, iOSDevCamp, Obama '08, Aptivism
- Website: 140characters.com

Dominic Thomas Sagolla (born January 4, 1974) is an American author, software engineer, educator, and surfer.

== Biography ==
Sagolla, commonly self described as a "co-creator" of Twitter, is user nine on the system (as "@dom"). He first pitched the idea at the podcasting startup Odeo in 2006.

Sagolla was the build engineer and community manager for President Obama's iPhone App team in 2008, which won praise from Steve Jobs. He is founder and executive director of iOS Developer Camp, the annual idea contest that has led to the founding of companies such as Square, TestFlight, and Getaround.

Sagolla is an alumnus of Swarthmore College, Harvard University Graduate School of Education and holds an honorary Doctor of Letters from Becker College. He is the author of "140 Characters: A style guide for the short form". Sagolla has been recognized as an International Genius by the Appsterdam Foundation.

Sagolla grew up in New England and is now a public speaker and innovator, represented by William Morris Endeavor / IMG.
