= Robert LoCascio =

American businessman (born 1968)

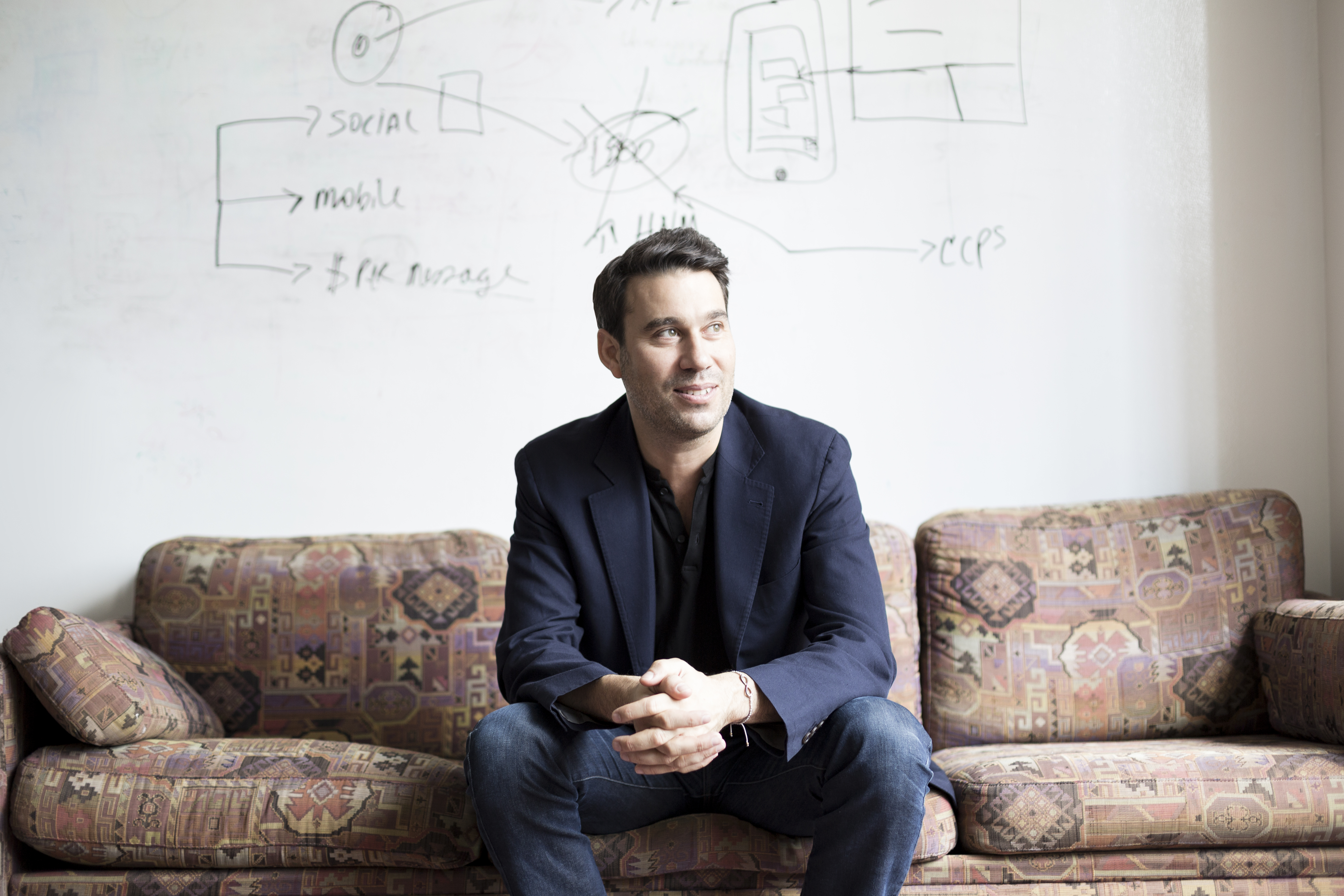
- Born: May 15, 1968 (age 58); Bay Shore, New York, U.S.
- Education: St. John the Baptist Diocesan High School; Loyola University Maryland (BBA)
- Occupation: Businessman
- Parent(s): Peter LoCascio; Connie Immordino

Robert LoCascio (born May 15, 1968) is an American businessman. He is the founder and former CEO of LivePerson and is attributed with creating one of the foundational technologies for AI web chat.

== Early life and education ==
LoCascio was born on May 15, 1968, in Bay Shore, New York, the son of Peter LoCascio and Connie LoCascio (née Immordino). LoCascio comes from a family of entrepreneurs. He graduated from St. John the Baptist High School in West Islip, New York, in 1986 and graduated with a BBA from Loyola University Maryland in 1990.

== Professional career ==
After graduation, LoCascio briefly worked for Elders IXL in the international chemicals trading division he got laid off when the company experienced cutbacks and vowed to never again work for anyone but himself. In 1991, he started his first company, Sybarite Media, Inc., a developer of interactive public kiosks that integrated interactive video features with advertising and commerce capabilities, charging his initial $50,000 investment on his credit cards. Due in part to the rise of the Internet, the interactive kiosk business did not succeed and was subsequently shut down in 1995. In 1995, LoCascio founded LivePerson.

LoCascio was the inventor of web chat for customer support in 1997 which was issued US6519628B1 patent in 1999, saying "I started LivePerson after one of my first experiences on the Internet. I had a product question on a site, but there was no one online that I could connect with. I had to dial a number, wait, and explain my whole dilemma. It was a very disconnected and disruptive experience. I thought the Internet was created so that we could "connect" with human beings, but what I experienced was the opposite. This created that ‘light bulb’ moment for me and helped set into motion what is now LivePerson."

LoCascio took LivePerson public in April 2000, with an IPO of $8 a share. As one of the last companies to go public before the crash, he had to cut staff and expenses after the market fell. "It was a terrible time, and we weren't celebrating, to say the least," LoCascio said. "But it saved us." During the worst of times, LoCascio lived out of his office space, sleeping on a couch that still sits in the LivePerson office today. The stock rebounded, returning to its original stock price almost 10 years later. LivePerson gained hold in the market being dubbed “the thriving alley survivor you’ve never heard of” by Crain's New York.

In 2011, LivePerson was named one of Fortune's 100 Fastest Growing Companies and one of Forbes’ 25 Fastest Growing Tech Companies. LoCascio employed over 1,000 people worldwide in 2015, and credits his recruiting philosophy as a main element in the company's success. In an article for Inc Magazine, he wrote “The most valuable employees are the ones that have more than the right skills for the job. They have the will to do the job with passion."

On October 1, 2015, LoCascio rang the opening bell at NASDAQ to celebrate 20 years in business, and shared his vision for LivePerson’s future: creating a world without 1-800 numbers, a world without ever being put on hold. LoCascio led the company to a major pivot in 2015 from being a chat company to becoming a asynchronous messaging company and subsequently pioneered the use of AI for customer service. LivePerson was chosen by Fast Company in 2022 as #1 Most Innovative AI Company in the World due to its work with AI with some of the largest brands in the world.

LoCascio was profiled in Forbes’ series of Thought Leaders Changing the Business Landscape and The New York Times’ Corner Office, and is the winner of the 2015 Smart CEO Circle of Excellence Award in Technology. In 2020, LivePerson was named one of Fast Company's Most Innovative AI Companies in the World.

LoCascio created a new company on May 1, 2024 called Eternos.life, which became Uare.ai. Eternos is dedicated to creating AIs for people to preserve their life story by creating an interactive AI that uses neural voice to share knowledge and guide future generations for eternity. The launch of the company featured Michael Bommer, Eternos first client who was a terminally ill cancer patient, and his quest to become the first AI to preserve his legacy. It was featured on many news outlets around the world including NBC News, New Nation, and NY Post.

Uare.ai is a technology platform that enables individuals, professionals, and creators to develop, share, and monetize individual AIs. The platform is centered on a proprietary framework known as the Human Life Model (HLM), which is designed to represent aspects of an individual’s knowledge, communication style, and experiences. Uare.ai has raised approximately $10.3 million as of November 2025 in venture funding from firms including Mayfield and Boldstart Ventures, supporting the development of its platform and expansion into both consumer and enterprise markets.

LoCascio wrote a column in Huffington Post and a column in Inc. Magazine

== Philanthropy ==
Beyond his business, LoCascio is the founder of the Dream Big Foundation, which started in 2001. Its first program was FeedingNYC, a hunger-relief project which delivers boxed meals to sheltered families in need throughout New York City on Thanksgiving. FeedingNYC was launched during the aftermath of 9/11 in the hopes of making a difference within the local community. Since 2001, over 80,000 Thanksgiving meals have been delivered to families in need.

In 2014 the Dream Big Foundation expanded and launched a new program to fund, mentor and coach budding entrepreneurs from the Brownsville, Brooklyn community by opening a cafe there. LoCascio wrote “Providing these budding entrepreneurs with those tools and resources to turn their idea into a successful business is the key to growing this community from the inside out, rather than becoming a casualty of gentrification. The café was scheduled to open in Spring, 2016. This work earned him the title of "Person of the Day" by Huffington Post in 2010. He is also active in the arts and works closely with the Salon program of the Juilliard School.

LoCascio was one of the founders of EqualAI in 2018, which is a non-profit focussed on providing frameworks for delivering AI in a safe and equitable manner. He is a founding member of the NYC Entrepreneurs Council of the Partnership for New York City and a mentor of the NYC Venture Fellows, a joint initiative formed by the 92Y and the NYCEDC to support global entrepreneurs in New York City.
