= Help desk software =

Software used by customer care operators

Help desk software is a computer program that enables customer-care operators to keep track of user requests and deal with other customer-care-related issues.

Generally, help desk software is part of an umbrella category called the service desk, which includes asset management and IT service management, and the two terms are sometimes used interchangeably. Help desk software specifically refers to the system that addresses customer queries.

== History ==
The history of help desk software dates back to the 20th century when businesses relied mostly on face-to-face interaction to resolve customer issues. Customers had to visit a company’s store or office with the product to get their problems solved.

With the invention of the telephone in 1876 and the telephone switchboard in the 1890s, the help desk assumed a better approach. Customers were able to reach their company and voice out their problem over the phone system. During the 20th-century era, companies used mainly equipment like dictation machines, typewriters, and dumb terminals with access to a mainframe computer, to address customer issues. The earliest use of computers for customer service was done through the use of mainframe software. Customers would submit paper forms or communicate their issue by phone to customer service agents who would seek avenues to handle the issues.

In the 1960s, companies began to set up call centers and also train staff to receive and handle customer inquiries in an organized and efficient manner. This was the era of Interactive voice response (IVR) which became a big boost to the telephone customer service system. Later on, Desktop PCs and email significantly improved help desk systems. Customers could communicate their problems by email, bypassing paper forms. Help desk agents could provide status updates and resolutions by email as well.

Meanwhile, the actual introduction of help desk systems began in 1980 when the internet was officially made available for public use. Many companies started outsourcing their customer service department. This led to the massive use of email and live chat systems in the 1990s. This new development enabled several US companies to outsource their help desk to low-cost countries like India and the Philippines.

In the 2000s, companies began adopting specialized help desk and customer communication platforms to manage support workflows and customer interactions. Examples of modern platforms include Zendesk and Intercom. This led to the massive production of different kinds of help desk software programs across the internet and the world at large. In recent times, the internet and networked systems make help desk software more interactive and participatory for customers and agents. Customer can now submit and track their issues more easily.

Customer service and help desk software systems have become increasingly popular in recent times. According to a recent report, there is a massive increase in sales of customer relationship management (CRM) software, which includes help desk software across the globe.

== Basic characteristics ==
Help desk software automates customer services in diverse ways. It typically consists of at least three parts. These include Ticket Management, Automation Suite, and Reporting/Optimization.

Help desk software has a point of contact for customers to send their queries and a ticketing system that tracks and organizes issues for faster resolution. It may also have a feature that aggregates and organizes queries and answers into a knowledge base, such as FAQs or guide articles. It may accommodate multiple points of contact; a working dashboard; and an analytics section. It may also have a feature that allows agents to escalate issues to a higher level.

More advanced help desk applications feature online chat, insights and analytics, automated processes, multiple contact channels, reporting tools, collaboration tools, and a CRM feature.

== Benefits ==
The following benefits are typically associated with help desk software:

- Any business that uses webmail for support tends to resolve customer support issues quicker and sees an increase in support productivity when they switch to help desk software.
- Help desk software automates tasks such as: ticket categorization and prioritization, ticket routing, alerts and notifications, ticket status management, and so on. With the right help desk solution, the workload is cut down as many tasks such as issue tracking, assigning, and ticket management can be automated.
- Some cloud-based help desk software has built-in security features, such as HIPAA compliance if for handling US health care information, or GDPR compliance for accepting requests from persons located in the European Union.

== Disadvantages ==
There are some disadvantages related to help desk software as well, mainly:

- Many help desk software platforms have expensive upfront costs as well as time-consuming implementation periods, which can significantly drain company resources. While most offer a trial option, effectively trialing software is difficult and time-consuming in a large organization. It's also difficult to evaluate the software with a full volume of tickets and staff in a short period of time.
- On-premises help desks can have costs associated with maintenance, upgrades, and scheduled downtime of servers, which are borne by the customer, not the help desk software provider.
- Cloud-based help desks can incur higher costs over longer periods of time. Cloud-based help desk software can become partially or entirely unavailable to users without an Internet connection. Consequently, unexpected disruptions in Internet connection may make such services temporarily unavailable.

== See also ==
- Customer service
- Customer support
- Help desk
- Issue tracking system
- Technical support
- Comparison of help desk issue tracking software
