= LivePerson =

American software company

LivePerson, Inc.
- Type: Public
- Traded as: Nasdaq: LPSN; TASE: LPSN; TA-35 Index Component
- ISIN: US5381461012
- Industry: Internet; Computer software
- Founded: 1995; 31 years ago
- Founder: Robert LoCascio
- Headquarters: New York City
- Area served: Worldwide
- Products: The Conversational Cloud; LP Insights
- Revenue: ▲US$366.6 million (2020)
- Number of employees: 1,201 (As of December 2020)
- Subsidiaries: LivePerson Ltd. (formerly HumanClick Ltd.); Kasamba Inc. Presto Experts; Contact At Once!, LLC; Engage Pty Ltd. LivePerson (UK) Ltd. LivePerson Netherlands B.V
- Website: www.liveperson.com

LivePerson is a global technology company that develops conversational commerce and AI software.

Headquartered in New York City, LivePerson is best known as the developer of the Conversational Cloud, a software platform that allows consumers to message with brands.

In 2018, the company announced its AI offering, allowing customers to create chatbots to answer consumer messages, alongside human customer service staff.

== History ==
LivePerson was founded in 1995 by Robert LoCascio. In April 2000, the company completed an initial public offering on the NASDAQ, in March 2011 its shares began trading on the Tel Aviv Stock Exchange and were included in the TA-100 Index and the TA BlueTech Index.

== Acquisitions ==
| Acquisition Date | Company | Business | References |
|---|---|---|---|
| October 2000 | HumanClick | Real-time online customer service applications | |
| July 2006 | Proficient Systems | Provider of hosted proactive, revenue generating on-site chat solutions | |
| October 2007 | Kasamba Inc. | Online provider of chat-based experts | |
| April 2010 | NuConomy | Web analytics and optimization platform | |
| May 2012 | Amadesa | Web marketing company specializing in predictive intelligence technology | |
| June 2012 | Look.io, Inc. | Mobile chat provider | |
| November 2012 | ENGAGE Pty Ltd. | Australian provider of cloud-based customer contact solutions | |
| April 2014 | NextGraph | Digital engagement solutions company | |
| June 2014 | Synchronite | Co-browsing and video chat | |
| November 2014 | Contact At Once | Leading platform for C2B sales conversations | |
| February 2018 | BotCentral | Leading Bot Platform for Enterprise AI and Conversational Commerce | |
| October 2018 | Conversable | Conversational commerce and AI platform | |
| July 2021 | e-bot7 | Conversational AI for Customer Service | |
| October 2021 | Tenfold | Customer experience integration platform | |
| October 2021 | VoiceBase | Voice analytics platform | |

== Products and services ==
- The Conversational Cloud — A customer messaging platform that allows organisations to communicate with customers, with the chat interface embedded into mobile apps, websites, or social media.
- LP Insights — Turns customers' chat transcripts into structured and unstructured data to provide actionable insights.

== See also ==
- Freshworks
- Intercom, Inc.
- LiveChat
- Tech companies in the New York metropolitan area
- Text
- Zendesk
