= Brad Farmerie =

Chef

- Education: Le Cordon Bleu, 1996
- Culinary career
- Rating(s): Michelin stars
- Previous restaurant(s): Public; Saxon + Parole

Brad Farmerie is a chef who served as the executive chef of Public and Saxon + Parole in New York City which were owned and operated by AvroKO Hospitality Group.

== Career ==
Farmerie was raised in Pittsburgh, Pennsylvania. After graduating from North Allegheny Senior High School in 1991 he attended Penn State, pursuing a mechanical engineering degree. Two years later, he left college and began exploring various world cuisines. He attended Le Cordon Bleu in London, United Kingdom, graduating in 1996. He trained under the guidance of experienced chefs at several restaurants including Chez Nico, Le Manoir aux Quat' Saisons and Coast, and the Sugar Club.

== See also ==
- List of Michelin starred restaurants
