= Conversational commerce =

E-commerce done via various means of conversation

Conversational commerce is e-commerce done via various means of conversation (live support on e-commerce Web sites, online chat using messaging apps, chatbots on messaging apps or websites, voice assistants) and using technology such as: speech recognition, speaker recognition (voice biometrics), natural language processing and artificial intelligence. Conversational commerce often relies on chatbots to automate routine interactions such as answering product questions or tracking orders across messaging platforms.

== Development ==
=== WeChat in China ===
During this time, in China, e-commerce via WeChat at its core a messaging app, but also letting merchants display their goods in mobile Web pages and via social feeds grew strongly. By 2013 e-commerce in China had overtaken that of the U.S.

=== Facebook Messenger ===
In 2016, Facebook announced its Facebook Messenger chatbot platform, heralding the arrival of conversational commerce via the most widely used messaging app in the world outside China. More than 34,000 businesses had opened shop on Messenger by August 2017.

Early cited examples of conversational commerce chatbots on Facebook Messenger include 1-800-FLOWERS with an IBM Watson artificial intelligence-powered chatbot/assistant, and Mexican airline Aeroméxico, whose chat platform running on Yalochat lets customers search, book, track, or check in for flights; ask any question, using A.I. and NLP to provide answers; or pull the chatbot into a group chat.

=== Apple Business Chat ===
In June 2017, Apple announced its Apple Business Chat product, allowing consumers and businesses to message each other via the Messages app.

=== WhatsApp ===
In September 2017 WhatsApp announced the pilot of its new Enterprise solution, the first time large companies would be able to attend to large groups of customers in an approved WhatsApp solution, after WhatsApp banned earlier unofficial solutions. Companies who piloted the solution included airlines Aeromexico, KLM, Latin American online travel agency Despegar and online retailer Linio.

Enterprise solutions for WhatsApp have been available since 2015 from a variety of third-party vendors, and though unofficial, they have been used by major companies and governments including the Governments of Colombia and Costa Rica.

=== Podium ===
In March 2020, Podium announced a contactless payment solution allowing local businesses to accept payments through two-way SMS text message conversations with customers. Outside of traditional instore card-present transactions, there existed only a few options for businesses to accept payments, most of which were not secure, PCI compliant, or convenient. Through Podium Payments, businesses can engage with customers and securely close sales all within the same convenient channel.

=== Telegram ===
In May 2017 Telegram supported basic payments in chats using bots and in April 2021, the payment 2.0 that supports payment in more than 200 countries via integration with 9 different payment providers.

=== Alexa and Google Assistant ===
Both Amazon and Google are providing APIs to enable payment via voice chat using stored payment credentials in Google Pay or Amazon Pay.

=== Web chat ===
Although, they do not have any functionalities to facilitate actual transactions within the conversation, companies like LiveChat Software, CM.com, and LivePerson have powered live conversations between customers and live agents as far back as the 2000s, before retail businesses used messaging apps to communicate with customers. Web Chat combined with configuration are made available through platforms like CustomFlow. As of 2025 different Large language model are assisting buyers to discover new products.
