= Fin (company) =

American software company

- Type: Private
- Industry: Enterprise software
- Founded: 2011; 15 years ago
- Founders: Eoghan McCabe; Des Traynor; Ciaran Lee; David Barrett
- Headquarters: San Francisco, California, U.S.
- Key people: Eoghan McCabe (Chairperson & CEO); Paul Adams (CPO); Darragh Curran (CTO); Dan Griggs (CFO)
- Revenue: ▲US$200 million (2021)
- Number of employees: 1,013 (2022)
- Website: fin.ai

Fin, formerly Intercom, Inc., is a software company that provides an AI-driven customer service and messaging platform. It is headquartered in San Francisco with offices in Chicago, Dublin, Sydney and London.

== History ==
Intercom was founded in California in 2011 by four Irish designers and engineers, Eoghan McCabe, Des Traynor, Ciaran Lee, and David Barrett. The founders had previously operated a software design consultancy named Contrast, which created the bug tracking tool called Exceptional. In 2011, Exceptional was sold to Rackspace, and the proceeds were used to establish Intercom.

In 2012, Intercom received an investment from Twitter co-founder Biz Stone, followed by seed funding from investors including David Sacks, Huddle founder Andy McLoughlin, Dan Martell, 500 Global (previously 500 Startups), and Digital Garage.

In March 2013, Intercom announced a $6 million Series A round led by Social Capital. In January 2014, it received a $23 million Series B funding led by Bessemer Venture Partners. Intercom also received a $50 million Series C-1 funding led by Index Ventures.

In 2017, Intercom offered to cover legal fees for individuals affected by a proposed U.S. travel ban who wished to relocate to Ireland.

In 2018, Intercom announced a $125 million Series D round led by Kleiner Perkins, with participation from Google Ventures.

In 2019, allegations of inappropriate conduct were made against co-founder Eoghan McCabe. The company stated that both internal and external investigations cleared him of wrongdoing. On July 1, 2020, Karen Peacock was appointed chief executive officer. In July 2021, co-founder and then-chief technology officer Ciarán Lee departed the company. The company's board reappointed McCabe as CEO in October 2022.

In 2023, Intercom scaled back some internal programs and public support for social causes. Subsequently, McCabe's activity on Twitter drew internal criticism from staff; he addressed the concerns in a company-wide meeting. In the same year, Intercom also ended support for the Twitter API support citing price changes.

In 2024, Intercom announced a $94 million investment in AI research and development.

In October 2025, Intercom opened a new research and development hub in Berlin, its first dedicated R&D center outside of Dublin and San Francisco. The company planned to hire 100 engineers, AI researchers, and designers for the hub, focusing on development of the Fin AI agent.

In March 2026, Intercom raised $250 million in venture debt from Hercules Capital to fund continued development of its AI agent platform. CEO Eoghan McCabe stated the company chose debt financing over equity to avoid diluting existing shareholders.

In May 2026, Intercom was renamed as Fin. In June 2026, Fin agreed to be acquired by Salesforce for approximately US$3.6 billion. The acquisition was initially expected to close in the fourth quarter of Salesforce's fiscal year 2027, subject to customary closing conditions and regulatory approvals.

On September 10, 2026, Salesforce completed its acquisition of Fin. Salesforce stated that Fin would operate as part of its AI Labs, continuing to serve its customers and develop its AI customer service technology.

== Products ==
Intercom's platform integrates live chat, chatbot automation, a help desk ticketing system, and a customer data platform. It allows businesses to add a chat interface to websites and mobile apps. The system includes a unified team inbox, knowledge base management, and tools for targeted in-app and email messages.

In 2017, Intercom introduced a chatbot named Operator. In 2022, the company rebuilt its Inbox and launched Surveys, for customer feedback, and Switch, which allows users to move from a phone call to a text chat.

In 2023, Intercom introduced Fin, an AI chatbot powered by large language models. Initially using OpenAI's GPT-4, Fin was designed to answer customer questions by referencing a company's help center content. By late 2023, Intercom reported that the bot could resolve nearly 50% of incoming queries automatically.

In 2024, Intercom released Fin 2, which uses Anthropic's Claude model. Fin 2 includes the ability to perform actions for customers in addition to answering questions. Intercom has integrated other AI features, such as conversation summaries, as part of its AI-first focus.

In March 2026, Intercom introduced Fin Apex 1.0, a post-trained language model for customer support resolution tasks.

In May 2026, Fin released Fin Operator, an AI agent to assist support operations teams by monitoring, configuring, and improving the performance of the customer-facing Fin AI agent.
