= CSM =

CSM may refer to:

== Arts and entertainment ==
- Cantigas de Santa Maria, a collection of medieval Galician-Portuguese vernacular songs and poems in praise of the Virgin Mary
- Chaos Space Marines, in the Warhammer 40,000 fictional universe
- Council of Stellar Management, an Eve Online player-elected council to represent the views of the players to the game maker
- Cigarette Smoking Man, a character in The X-Files television series
- C.S. Murugabhoopathy (1914–1998), Indian mridangam player
- Chainsaw Man, a manga written and illustrated by Tatsuki Fujimoto

== Education ==
- Calcutta School of Music, a music school in Calcutta, India
- Camborne School of Mines, an institution of higher education in Cornwall, UK
- Central Saint Martins, an art and design institution in London, UK
- Cork School of Music, a music school in Cork, Ireland
- Colegio Suizo de México, a Swiss international school in Mexico
- Certified Strategic Manager, a professional certification

=== United States ===
- College of San Mateo, a community college in San Mateo, California
- College of Southern Maryland, a community college with campuses in Charles, St. Mary's and Calvert Counties, Maryland
- Colorado School of Mines, a university in Golden, Colorado, specializing in engineering and applied sciences with a focus on natural resources
- College of Saint Mary, a Catholic women's college in Omaha, Nebraska

== Finance ==
- CARICOM Single Market, the first phase of CARICOM Single Market and Economy, a single market union between Caribbean states
- Clearing and settlement mechanism, for example see Ethereum

== Science and technology ==
- Apollo command and service module, a component of the Apollo spacecraft
- Scientific Centre of Monaco, research centre in Monaco
- Cerebrospinal meningitis, an acute infectious form of meningitis caused by the bacterium Neisseria meningitidis
- Chopped strand mat, a form of glass-reinforced plastic
- Circumstellar material, which surrounds some stellar objects and may contribute to the increased luminosity of certain hypernovae events
- Climate System Model, the atmospheric component of the Community Climate System Model (CCSM)
- Continuous shuffling machine, a machine used by casinos to shuffle cards
- Cortical stimulation mapping, a procedure that aims to localize the function of specific brain regions through direct electrical stimulation
- Crop simulation model, a model used to simulate crop yield based on weather conditions, soil conditions, and crop management practices
- Hypalon, marketing name for a synthetic rubber made of chlorosulfonated polyethylene

=== Computing ===
- Cascaded shadow maps, a form of shadow mapping in computer graphics design
- Certified Scrum Master, a certification for Scrum administered by Scrum Alliance
- Certified software manager, a certification by the Software and Information Industry Association
- Client Side Modification, a modification in Client Software that is mostly used to change, add or unlook functionality
- Cloud Service Mesh, part of Google's Anthos platform
- Cluster Systems Management, management for IBM Power Systems servers running AIX or Linux operating system, as well as Linux on x64 rack and blade servers
- Communications Support Module, an IBM term for the support of single sign-on in its Informix database
- Compatibility Support Module, a part of some UEFI firmware implementations providing legacy BIOS compatibility
- Computational science modeling, constructing models and quantitative analysis techniques and using computers; See Computational science
- Computational solid mechanics, computer modeling of solid matter, typically with finite elements; See Solid mechanics
- Content storage management, an audio, video and rich media archiving technology originally conceived by Front Porch Digital
- Content Switching Module, an add-on to the Cisco Catalyst 6500 Series Switch or the Cisco 7600 Series Router

== Military ==
- Company sergeant major, a warrant officer appointment in the British and most Commonwealth armies and the Royal Marines
- Command Sergeant Major, a rank in the United States Army
- Conspicuous Service Medal, an Australian military decoration

== Organizations ==
- Canadian Society of Medievalists
- The Christian Science Monitor, an international weekly newspaper published by the Church of Christ, Scientist
- Center for Superfunctional Materials, with the director Kwang Soo Kim
- Christian Socialist Movement, former name of a British socialist organisation
- Committee on Safety of Medicines, a defunct British government advisory committee
- Consiglio Superiore della Magistratura (High Council of the Judiciary), an Italian juridical institution
- Common Sense Media, a San Francisco-based non-profit education and advocacy organization
- Companion of the Sacred Mission, an Anglican religious order; See Society of the Sacred Mission
- Union of the Committees of Soldiers' Mothers of Russia, a Russian human rights organisation
- Creation Science Movement, a British creationist organisation

=== Businesses ===
- Chartered Semiconductor Manufacturing, a semiconductor foundry in Singapore
- Chateau Ste. Michelle, an American winery
- Cravath, Swaine & Moore, an international law firm
- CSM N.V., a Dutch maker of baking supplies

== Sport ==
- Canadian Ski Marathon, a ski tour
- Centro Sportivo Maruinense, a Brazilian football (soccer) club

== Other uses ==
- Castleton Moor railway station, North Yorkshire, England (National Rail station code)
- Customer success manager, in customer success
- Clinton-Sherman airport (IATA code), civil airport in Clinton, US
- Central Sierra Miwok (ISO 639-3 code), a Miwok language spoken in California, US
- Chhatrapati Shivaji Maharaj, a Marathi warrior and ruler
