= Federation Against Software Theft =

FAST Iis Logo

The Federation Against Software Theft (FAST) is a not-for-profit organisation, formed in 1984 with the aim of eliminating copyright infringement of software in the UK. FAST was the world's first Anti-piracy organisation to work on protecting the copyrights of software publishers. Initially concentrating on lobbying parliament to revise Copyright law, FAST also prosecutes organisations and individuals for copyright infringement on behalf of its members and publicises the legal penalties and security risks.

Prior to the agreement with FAST, Investors in Software were a not-for-profit organisation limited by guarantee with a mission to support and advance professionalism in Software Asset Management and related IT asset management, to enable individuals and organisations to improve effectiveness and efficiency. As a direct result of their work the ISO SAM ISO 19770 standard was successfully launched in May 2006.

== History ==
In September 2008 FAST and Investors in Software signed an exclusive agreement to operate under the Federation name to strengthen and clarify the advice given to the end user community relating to best practice for Software Asset Management (SAM) and achieving cost efficient licence compliance. The new organisation would operate under the name FAST IiS.

In May 2008 FAST IiS launched an initiative with the aim of making it easier for end users to manage their software licensing requirements to contain costs and ensure effective Software Asset Management / software licence management encompassing compliance, the Software Industry Research Board (SIRB), was formed in consultation with five of the tier one software vendors.

FAST IiS remains a not-for-profit organisation limited by guarantee and wholly owned by its members who include software publishers, resellers, distributors, SAM practitioners and law firms. FAST IiS works to champion the professional management of software and protect members’ rights.

Since its inception FAST has successfully lobbied for changes in the software IP system in the UK and EU through its dealings with the UK Intellectual Property Office. FAST's lobbying efforts brought about amendments to the Copyright Act 1956, culminating in software being recognised as a literary work.

In 2007 FAST, with the Alliance Against IP Theft, was successful in pushing for the implementation of Section 107A Copyright, Designs and Patents Act 1988 and having IP crime as a measurement on the National Policing Safety Plan.
