= TISM (disambiguation) =

TISM are an alternative rock band from Melbourne, Australia.

TISM may also refer to:

- This Is Serious Mum, a 1984 demo tape
- The Incredible Shrinking Man, a 1957 science fiction film
- Tulane Institute of Sports Medicine, part of Tulane University School of Science and Engineering
- Telecom Italia San Marino, a San Marino telecommunications company owned by Telecom Italia
- Tism or 'tism, slang for autism

== See also ==
- TIMS (disambiguation)
- TSM (disambiguation)
- TMS (disambiguation)
