= Uptime Devices =

Environmental monitoring company

Uptime Devices, Inc.
- Company type: Private company
- Founded: 1997
- Headquarters: Austin, Texas, United States
- Key people: Jean-Paul Daemen, CEO
- Products: Data center infrastructure management tools, Environmental monitoring
- Website: uptimedevices.com

Uptime Devices was an environmental monitoring company in Austin, Texas from 1997 to 2019. They produced a range of tools that are utilized in Data center infrastructure management (DCIM). As of 2010, they had sold over 40,000 units in over 24 countries.

Uptime Devices was credited with creating the first SNMP-based environmental monitoring device, Sensor Hub. The company provided products that allow communication between physical environments and networks.

In 2008, Uptime Devices introduced the Daisy Chain Sensor® technology platform. The platform allows environmental sensors to be chained together over long distances by Ethernet.

== Product ranges ==
Uptime Devices provided monitoring solutions that detect environment, security, or power threats.
