= 33 Signal Regiment (Canada) =

- Active: 2010–present
- Country: Canada
- Branch: Communications and Electronics Branch Canadian Army Primary Reserve
- Size: 2 Squadrons
- Part of: 33 Canadian Brigade Group
- Garrison/HQ: Ottawa, Ontario
- Mottos: TIGO API TIGO IMA, (Anishinaabemowin phrase meaning "Any time, any place")
- Website: www.canada.ca/en/army/corporate/4-canadian-division/33-signal-regiment.html

Commanders
- Commanding officer: LCol JJ Miranda, CD
- Regimental sergeant major: CWO Gerry Umbach, CD
- Abbreviation: 33 Sig Regt

33 Signal Regiment, formerly known as 763 Communication Regiment, is a primary reserve Canadian Army unit of the Royal Canadian Corps of Signals (part of the Communications and Electronics Branch) in Ottawa, Ontario.

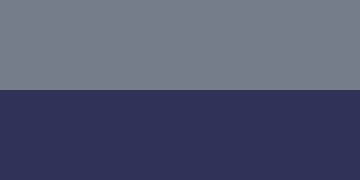
The C&E Branch flag

== Location ==
The unit is currently located at Major Edward Holland VC Armoury at 2100 Walkley Road, Ottawa, Ontario.

== History ==
33 Signal Regiment began on 12 October 1922 as the 3rd Battalion, Canadian Corps of Signals. It was redesignated as the 3rd Divisional Signals Regiment in 1926 and was divided into signal companies for the 1st and 2nd Canadian Divisions in the Second World War. Following the war it became the 3rd Signal Regiment until 1970 when it was allocated to Canadian Forces Communication Command (authorized on 1 April 1965) and redesignated as 703 Communication Regiment. Its mandate was to provide operationally trained communications personnel and to support the Regular Force in ongoing peacetime tasks and activities. On 1 June 1976 the unit was renamed 763 (Ottawa) Communication Regiment. The newly formed 76 Communication Group took command of 763 Communication Regiment from 70 Communication Group on 1 April 1977. The Regiment was housed at Wallis House Armoury in Ottawa and its support services were provided by CFB Ottawa. In the summer of 2010 it was renamed 33 Signal Regiment following its entrance into 33 Canadian Brigade Group (CBG).

33 Signal Regiment specializes in tactical and strategic communication, employing voice, electronic and telecommunication systems. Their mandate is to provide individual and collective support to Canadian Forces operations, both domestic and international. Many of their members have served in various UN and NATO peacekeeping missions around the world. This unit also provides communication support to the Army Reserve. Some units in the Communication Reserve also provide manning support to the Navy Transportable Tactical Command Centres.

== Regimental badge ==
33 Signal Regiment Badge

On 15 June 2017, the new badge for 33 Signal Regiment was granted by the Governor General.

763 Communication Regiment Badge In July 1982, Her Majesty Queen Elizabeth approved a regimental badge having a right arm rising from three rivers; the Ottawa, Gatineau, and the Rideau, the definition used by the local indigenous inhabitants for identifying the locality. The trees acknowledge the importance of logging, the original commerce of the area. Combined, they reflect the traditional source of unit members as the Ottawa Valley. The arm holds a single reflex bow to show the operational environment. A double curve motif formed from a two-string wampum completes the design. In Algonquin legend, such a motif exuded power that could be oriented inwards, such as seen on women's and children's clothing to protect the wearer, or outwards as a way to transmit the bearer's power to others, not as electromagnetic energy (as we do today) but as an intangible such as information, providing the recipient with the power of knowledge. It also forms the figure "3", significant through the unit's history. String wampum was used by natives to pass messages, with the rarer purple beads being for the important parts, and the white beads for the rest. A such, it was a primitive version of encryption, and the reason that all messengers found with one were tortured: it was important. The motto, tigoapi, tigamoa, is Algonquin for "anyplace, anytime". The overall design is, from the Ottawa, secure communications for others, anywhere, anytime. The Algonquin had no word for "where": they used "place".

== Training ==
Training is a year-round activity and soldiers are expected to attend up to two weekend training activities per month. Training is conducted at E.J.G. Holland VC Armoury and other locations. Once fully trained, soldiers can apply for various full-time and part-time employment opportunities available throughout the year.

== Peacetime activity ==
The regiment is not without distinction, having won the Malloch Trophy, symbolic of the best signals unit in Canada, both pre and post-war more than any other unit in the history of the competition.

The regimental unit has served in most places the Canadian Forces are stationed across the nation and on deployed operations.

The regiment has also shown continued support to local community and charity events such as the Scott Tokessy Baseball Tournament, the Canadian Blood Services Blood Bank, the Ottawa Food Bank and, most notably for 25 years till 2016 providing communications links and a safety presence for the Canadian Ski Marathon.

== Deployments ==
The regimental unit has served in most places the Canadian Forces are stationed across the nation and on deployed operations including:

International:

- Bosnia
- East-Timor
- Israel (Golan Heights)
- United Arab Emirates
- Operation Athena – Canadian deployment with the International Security Assistance Force in Afghanistan.
- Operation Attention – Canadian deployment with NATO Training Mission in Afghanistan.
- Operation Calumet - CAF role in the Multinational Force and Observers (MFO) in the Sinai Peninsula of Egypt.
- Operation Impact – Canada's contribution to the US-led international coalition against ISIS.
- Operation Reassurance – Deployment in Central and Eastern Europe as part of NATO reassurance measures.

Domestic:

- Operation Abacus – Y2K Canadian computer rollover response 1999
- Operation Cadence – Security for the 2010 G8/G20 summit.
- Operation Laser – Domestic response to the COVID-19 pandemic.
- Operation Lentus – Contingency plan that outlines the joint response to provide support for humanitarian assistance and disaster response (HADR) to provincial and territorial authorities in the case of a major natural disaster that overwhelms their capacity to respond.
- Operation Nanook – To assert Canada's sovereignty over its northernmost regions, to enhance the Canadian Armed Forces' ability to operate in Arctic conditions, to improve coordination in whole-of-government operations, and to maintain interoperability with mission partners for maximum effectiveness in response to safety and security issues in the North
- Operation Nunalivut - Annual winter northern sovereignty operations
- Operation Provision - in 2016 support of the 25,000 Syrian Refugees resettlement
- Operation Recuperation - in 1998 (North American ice storm of 1998)

== Occupations ==
33 Signal Regiment primarily employs the following occupations in the Canadian Army, among others:

- Signal Operator
- Line Technician
- Signal Intelligence Specialist
- Signal Technician
- Information Systems Technician
- Supply technician
- Human resources administrator
- Finance services administrator
- Mobile support equipment operator
- Signals officer

== Equipment ==
The Regiment operates a variety of vehicles, including:

- Light Support Vehicle Wheeled (LSVW)
  LSVW Command Posts
  - Command Post variant
  - Cargo variant
  - Cable laying variant
- Light Utility Vehicle Wheeled (LUVW) Militarized Commercial-Off-The-Shelf (MilCOTS)
  LUVW MilCOTS - Line Laying variant
  - Standard variant
  - Cable laying variant
- Medium Support Vehicle System (MSVS) Militarized Commercial-Off-The-Shelf (MilCOTS)
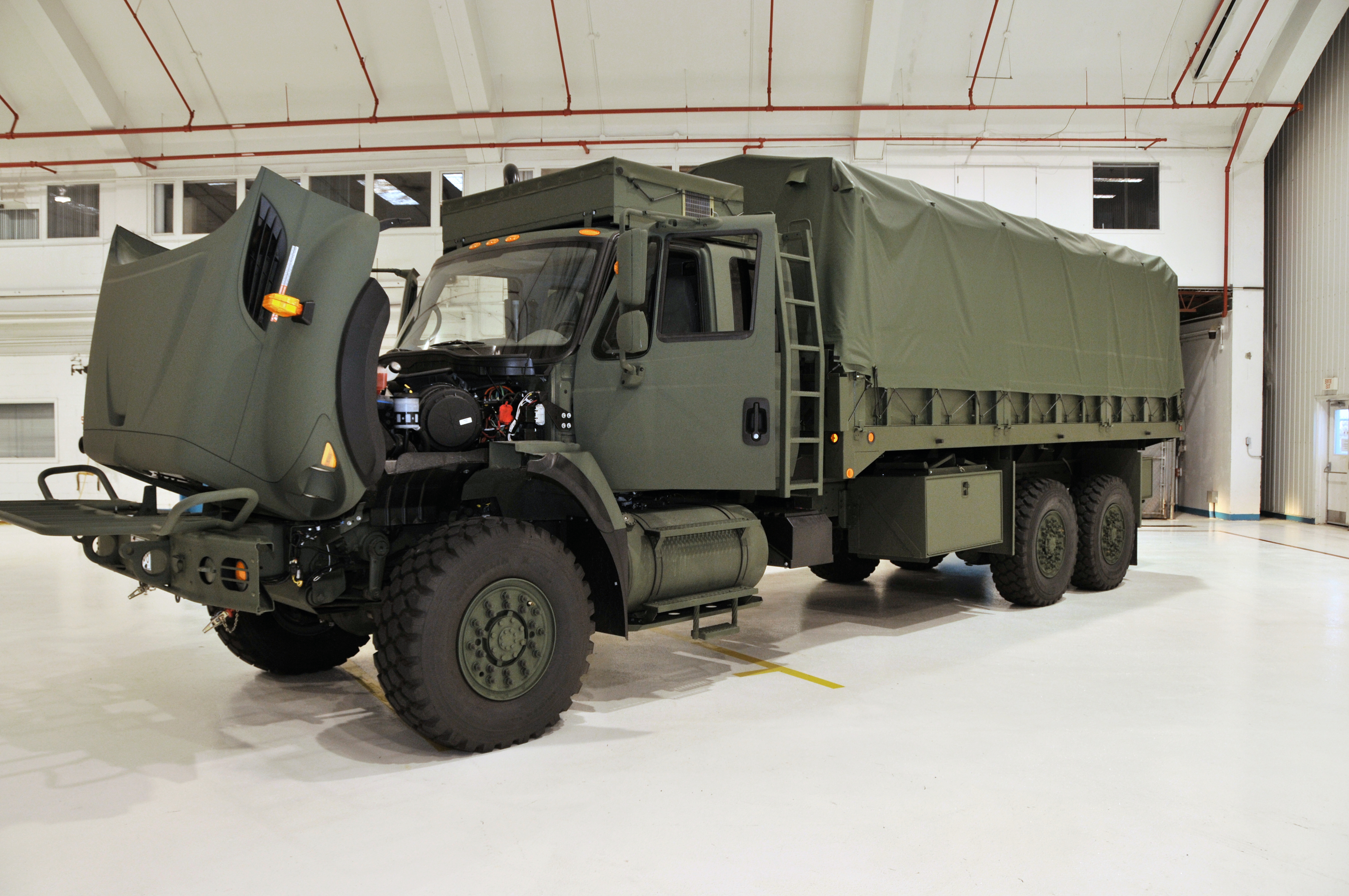
  MSVS MilCOTS
  - Cargo variant
  - Flatbed variant
- G-Wagon
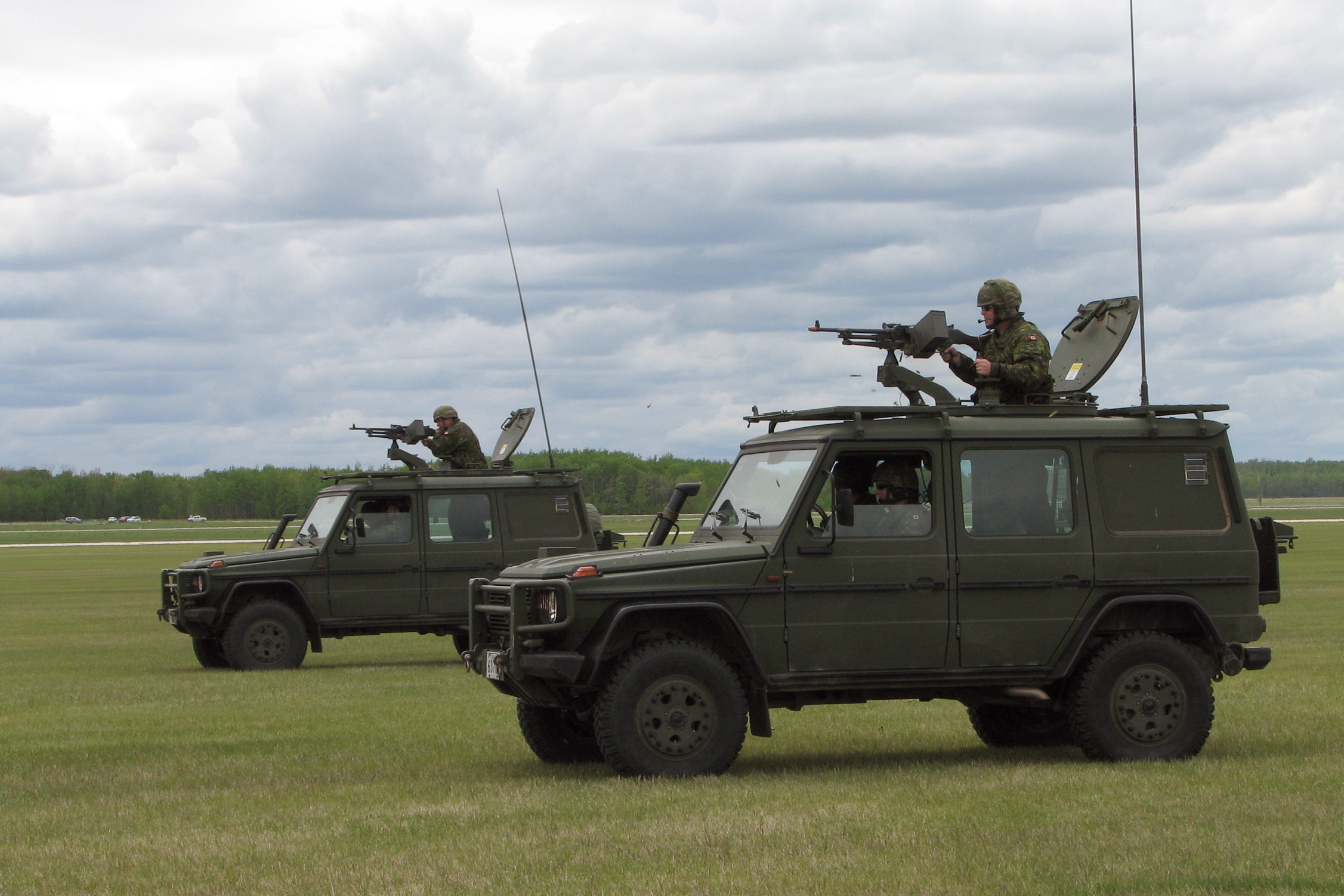
  G-Wagon

Radio and Telephone equipment includes:

- Truck mounted VHF and HF Radio systems
- Man portable (MANPACK) VHF and HF Radio systems
- Static Radio systems
- Mobile Satellite Units (MSU)
- Satellite telephones
- Switchboards
- AN/PRC-138

IRIS family of radios

- AN/PRC-521
- AN/PRC-522
- AN/VRC-513 (V) 1
- AN/PRC-513 (V) 2

Personal Weapons

- C7A2 5.56mm Rifle
- Browning 9mm Pistol
- C9 5.56mm Light Machine Gun

== Honorary lieutenant-colonel ==
On March 24, 2010, Justin Fogarty was formally appointed honorary lieutenant-colonel of the 33 Signal Regiment. HLCol Fogarty is the managing partner of Regent Law Professional Corporation. HLCol Fogarty is now the Honorary Colonel of the Toronto Scottish Regiment.

Shortly following his appointment, HLCol Fogarty formed the Regimental Council of the Regiment, made up of 33 distinguished members from the business community to advise the Command Team at 33 Signal Regiment, promote the relationship between the business community and the Army, provide assistance on different initiatives important for the regiment and to assist in fund-raising initiatives for soldiers and their families.
