= WG 21 =

WG 21 or working group 21 may refer to:

- ISO/IEC JTC 1/SC 7/WG 21, which publishes IT asset management standards
- ISO/IEC JTC 1/SC 22/WG 21, which publishes the C++ standard
