= Certified software manager =

IT asset management

Certified software manager (CSM) is a professional designation for IT asset management. The course was developed by the Software Publishers Association (now SIIA) in 1994 as a component of one of the first global anti-piracy efforts, led by Ken Wasch. In 2004, the administration of the CSM, and its successor class the Advanced Software Manager, moved to Washington, DC–based LicenseLogic. According to ITIL, a Software Manager is defined as a person who manages "…all the infrastructure and processes necessary for the effective management, control, and protection of the software assets…throughout all stages of their lifecycle."

The course syllabus walks the attendee through from the beginning of "What is Software Asset Management (SAM)?" through to developing a basic asset management program for their organization.

The CSM is the basis for various other ITAM courses.
