= TSM =

TSM may refer to:

- Taiwan Semiconductor Manufacturing Company, a semiconductor foundry (NYSE ticker TSM)
- TSM (esports), a professional esports team and gaming community website
- IBM Tivoli Storage Manager, a backup software product
- Texas Student Media, a student media operation of The University of Texas at Austin
- Toulouse School of Management, a French management college
- Trinity School for Ministry, a seminary in Pennsylvania
- Trapezoidal Shadow Map, a technique for real-time shadow mapping
- Team service management, a management framework
- Trusted service manager, a business role in the mobile payment environment
- Teaching-suggestion-motivation, a test of inventive step and non-obviousness in patent law
- Superior Military Court (Portuguese: Tribunal Superior Militar), one of the federal courts of Brazil
- Station code for Tasikmalaya railway station

== Entertainment ==
- The Shrinking Man, a 1956 novel
- The Simpsons Movie, a 2007 film
- The Suicide Machines, a punk band
- Toy Story Mania!, a theme park attraction
- Skull Man, 2 manga and 1 anime series

=== Games ===
- The Sims Medieval, a 2011 video game
