= Canadian Ski Marathon =

- Status: active
- Genre: sporting event
- Date: February
- Frequency: annual
- Location: Ottawa River
- Country: Canada
- Inaugurated: 1967

The Canadian Ski Marathon is a ski tour. It is held annually just north of the Ottawa River between the regions of Montreal and Ottawa, capital of Canada, in February and usually covers a distance of 160 km (99 mi). However, it is a ski tour, not a race: participants challenge not each other, but themselves by choosing a level of difficulty and trying to accomplish that goal.

== Ski marathon ==
The Marathon, which has been running since Canada's Centennial year of 1967, is the longest in the world. It consists of 10 sections of varying lengths and difficulties which can either be skied together over the two days (five stages per day), or individually on subsequent days.

The earliest iterations of the marathon started in Lachute with the second day ending in Gatineau. After about 25 years the pattern was changed such that, in even-numbered years participants skied eastward toward from the a start in Buckingham (a district of Gatineau); odd numbered years saw participants travel in the opposite direction. For the 2018, 2019 and 2020 editions, the Marathon starts in Arundel, Quebec, just south of Mont-Tremblant and ends in Lachute. In 2021 and 2022 the Canadian ski marathon (CSM) was held virtually, with anyone recording two consecutive cross country gps trails of 50 and 60 km earning an award. In 2023, the CSM started in Arundel, Quebec and ended in Buckingham.

In all cases, the end of the first day of the Marathon has participants ending in (or near as is the case of certain skier classes) the scenic town of Montebello, Quebec, where they resume their proper course the following day.

The new trail, called the Northern Trail, offers better snow cover and less road skiing, according to the organizing committee. The Western Trail (Buckingham-Montebello) may be reused in future editions.

The two-day event is open to anyone of any age or ability, but the course is extremely challenging in places, which skiers of lesser ability tend to avoid by choosing easier sections to tackle. Of note is the section west of the Lac Carling resort, which is known throughout the Marathon as the most difficult section.

There are two broad categories of skier: Coureur des Bois (who start out before dawn to ski the entire distance; named after the coureur des bois) and Tourer (who start out at 8 a.m. to ski any number of the 10 sections). The Coureur des Bois category, in turn, is broken down into Bronze (ski the whole trail), Silver (ski the whole trail with a pack), and Gold (ski the whole trail with a pack and camp out overnight). Tourers are able to ski as individuals, or as teams. A new feature of the marathon is the "mini-CSM" or "Taster" which allows participants to ski two sections of the trail over the weekend, one per day.

Traditionally, the hardest goal is the Gold Coureur des Bois category. Also, one may register for skiing at the Gold level only after completing the Silver and Bronze levels in previous years. Doing the Gold five times—over any number of years—results in that person earning a permanent bib, meaning that they are given a number that is then retired from the list of bib numbers. As of 2012, 300 Coureur des Bois skiers—primarily men, and a much smaller number of women—have earned permanent bibs by earning 5 Golds: 1 Gold Award and 4 Gold Bars.

The marathon has hundreds of volunteers who brave the cold to help skiers the entire weekend at checkpoints, providing safety + sweeps, waxing services, trail work, awards, and administration. These volunteers include members of local service organizations such as Scouting and Guiding, community groups, and cadets. Major logistical support is provided by 33 Signals Regiment of the Canadian forces, who provide vital safety and water points along the trail, and if needed provide traffic control.

== See also ==
- Skiing and skiing topics
- Tour de Ski
