= Operation Abacus =

1999–2000 Canadian military operation for Y2K

Operation Abacus was a Canadian military operation formed in 1999 in response to anticipated disruption due to the year 2000 problem or the Y2K bug. It was intended as a contingency plan not just to coordinate the protection of government computers but also ensure social order if computing systems went down. For these purposes, the Canadian Forces (CF) allocated $400 million and established a headquarters in Ottawa on February 27. The command center was linked to five other regional centers located across Canada. The military also mobilized more than 10,000 troops for Operation Abacus deployments during the early part of the year 2000. These units, which has previously conducted training exercises, were tasked to restore order and vital services if the turn of the millennium caused disruption to computer systems, and to conduct patrols against looters and to prevent or stop rioting.
