= Team service management =

Team service management (TSM) is an open-source management framework that uses and integrates existing management methods and techniques to help teams deliver ever improving services. TSM is designed to be used by any and all teams within an enterprise including (but not limited to) sales, production, administration, IT, finance and management teams.

Over 60% of organisations across the world covering private and public sector organisations are now service-based. Physical product enterprises can have the majority of their teams involved in performing service activities, mostly the provision of internal services to other teams, referred to as internal customers, with the minority of teams involved in the control of physical products and materials. For those enterprises whose purpose is to provide physical products, the competitive differentiator is frequently around the way they deliver services, around and in addition to the products.

== Use ==
Team service management pulls together and integrates a number of established management methods and techniques in an open source framework for any team to use without reference to consultants. It is intended to complement process centric frameworks notably ITIL and ITSM where management disciplines and the associated processes are defined, but the people and team working aspects are not fully considered.

== Components ==
TSM integrates the following methods and techniques:

Action-centered leadership, from John Adair – to make sure teams work well together, ACL ensures 3 dimensions: the team, the task and the individual are in balance and effective. TSM turns 'Task' into service and adds management and leadership to the model, and renames it team dynamics.

Team lifecycle from Bruce Tuckman – to assess and improve the maturity of teams. TSM uses the forming, storming, norming, performing maturity phases model to help teams maximise their effectiveness. It uses the 'S or bell curve' model (used to define product and technology lifecycles) to illustrate the team lifecycle phases and the illustrate discontinuity when you reengineer teams in the same way there is discontinuity when you move from one technology to the next generation.

Behaviour/attitude/culture/traits to address teams and individuals barriers to change. TSM looks at the people change management addressing the people barriers to effective team and individual working and the provision of services. It helps individuals and teams change their behaviour and attitude, and where possible their culture and traits.

Business service management, a development on the ITIL framework – to help teams focus on and manage the services they deliver. TSM helps teams define the services they provide, their service activities, the service performance objectives, service issues, the capabilities needed to deliver the team services, and identify service and capability improvements.

EFQM, the European Forum for Quality Management – to ensure that team result and team enablers objectives and capabilities are effective and in unison. TSM defines 4 result domains of customer results, finance results, regulatory results and service results, and then ensures the 5 enabler domains are supportive of the getting the results the team needs. The TSM enabler capabilities that are: people, process and technology, along with knowledge and suppliers.

Balanced scorecard, Kaplan and Norton's strategic planning method – to manage team strategy, objectives, performance and improvement initiatives. TSM uses the standard balanced scorecard to set top down objectives for each team and creates a team strategy for operating and improving the team with planned initiatives. TSM extends the four standard balanced scorecard perspectives to the nine of EFQM: It extends the two result domains of customer and finance to four by adding service results and regulatory results; and extends the two enabler domains of people and process to the five by adding technology, knowledge and suppliers.

Personal performance and development plans (PDPs) to ensure that individual performance and Improvement are an integral part of the team's performance and improvement. TSM ensures that individual's performance and development plans are linked to the team's balanced scorecard. So individuals are allocated their share of responsibility for achieving the team's result and enabler objectives, and are allocated their share of ownership of the team's Improvement Initiatives.

The PDCA cycle

Deming's Plan–do–check–act (PDCA) to ensure team and individuals improvement is incremental and continual. TSM takes the Improvement Initiatives and breaks them into bite sized chunks so that they can be delivered incrementally over a short period of time. The chunks or increments are subject to the PDCA cycle where the increment is first planned, then done, then checked, and then finally but most importantly the lessons learned the results achieved assessed so that the next increment the next/ subsequent PDCA cycles can be planned or re-planned to move most effectively to achieving the overall outcome for the Initiative.

Performance management to ensure that all the activities of each team are transparent and linked to the services delivered and the improvements needed. TSM ensures that work and performance of the team is recognised, recorded and analysed and acted upon. It ensures that resource use, and service effectiveness are both recorded and that issues encountered in undertaking the work of the team are recorded and acted upon feeding in more improvement initiatives into the appropriate point of the TSM framework.

== See also ==
Service management
International Organization for Standardization
Microsoft Operations Framework
Social group
The Five Dysfunctions of a Team
Service economy
