= EuNetworks =

European provider of bandwith

euNetworks Group Limited
- Company type: Public
- Traded as: SGX:5VT:SI
- Industry: Telecommunications
- Founded: 2002
- Headquarters: London, UK
- Key people: Paula Cogan (chief executive officer); Brady Rafuse (non-executive chairman); Richard Taylor (general counsel)
- Products: Telecommunications
- Number of employees: 201-500
- Website: eunetworks.com

euNetworks (formerly known as Global Voice Group Limited) is a European provider of bandwidth infrastructure services. It originated in a management buyout led by Noel Meaney of the European assets of Metromedia Fiber Network which had entered Chapter 11 in 2002.

euNetworks own and operate 18 fibre based metropolitan networks across Europe connected with a high capacity intercity backbone covering 51 cities in 15 countries.

Their metro networks are in London, Manchester, Dublin, Amsterdam, Rotterdam, Utrecht, Paris, Frankfurt, Cologne, Düsseldorf, Stuttgart, Munich, Hamburg, Berlin, Vienna, Milan, Brussels and Madrid. They also directly connect 14 cloud platforms with their network with access to additional platforms.

euNetworks is headquartered in London with offices across Europe. In 2018 a majority stake was acquired by Stonepeak in euNetworks., since then Stonepeak has led a recapitalisation of euNetworks as well as further acquisitions such as in Belgium.

== euNetworks' Products ==
- Colocation
- Dark Fibre
- Metro Wavelengths
- Long Haul Wavelengths
- Carrier Ethernet
- Internet
